= Marukos =

Legendary crossroads demon in Ilocano mythology

The Marukos (alternatively spelled Marrukos, or Manrucos in colonial era texts) is a legendary crossroads demon in Ilocano mythology, associated with the dried up shrublands of western ilocos riverbeds, and known for waylaying large travelling groups, causing them to be lost until the entire group is drowned by flashfloods. In the stories, only one member of the group usually survives the attack, usually a young girl.

== Appearance ==
Stories about the Marukos often only describe the stern disembodied voice of an old man, telling off whatever group had earned his ire. In an 1887 account, however, the story speaks of an old man in a white "camisa" whose aged flesh looked like that of a corpse.

== Stories ==
Stories of the Marukos are associated with crossings on many of the rivers of the Ilocos Region, with accounts associated with the Padsan, Nagbaduan, Amburayan, Agoo, and Bued Rivers.

The earliest was an offhand account by Juan Francisco Maura in his “La Relación del suceso de la venida del tirano chino del gobernador Guido de Lavezares", where he notes that the natives living near Padsan and Nagbaduan lived in fear of a creature called the "Morrucos," who caused entire groups of travellers to drown in floods.

Another Spanish colonial legend recounted by Don Isabelo de los Reyes associates the name of the Marukos (spelled "manrukos" in the 1887 text) with the etymology of the Municipality of Rosario, La Union. In the legend, a group of youths were playing around and being noisy while loitering around near the floodplains of the Bued River between Rosario and Sison on a Sunday. They were then confronted by an old man in white garb, whose flesh looked like a corpse – the Marukos. The creature accused them of engaging in leisure activities on a holy day and put a curse on them, causing them to lose their sense of direction. As a result, they failed to notice that they were about to be swept away by one of the flash floods that often plagued the river. In the end, only a young girl survived the encounter with the Marukos, by clinging to a Balingkawanay (Pittosporum pentandrum) tree. According to De Los Reyes, some stories claim that the girl had survived by praying the Rosary, while other stories say that her name was Rosario. Either way, the story of the Marukos became closlely associated with the etymology of the town of Rosario, which used to be part of Pangasinan. The legend is generally treated as a cautionary tale against raucousness and gallivanting on "the Lord's holy day" of Sunday.

Modern stories of the Marukos are relatively rare, but news accounts from 1976 recount that a young girl from the Southern La Union National High School had stayed in school until past curfew (the Philippines was then under martial law), and was passing by the Taytay Principe bridge over the Agoo River on her way home to Barangay Macalva when she was stopped by a platoon of soldiers about to arrest her for violating curfew. However, a disembodied voice which the girl claimed was a Marukos called out from the dark and told the soldiers to quickly report back to their barracks in town. The girl made it to her home all right, but the soldiers did not. The account quotes her as saying "The Marukos called the soldiers away and I never saw them again."

News accounts about the "Marrukos" from 1992 tell a tale almost identical to the 1976 account, but with the setting changed to the Amburayan River near Tagudin. Instead of the martial law curfew, the story referred to a curfew for minors that had been imposed on Tagudin at the time. Some scholars believe that the Amburayan story is merely a retelling of the 1976 story, revived because of social tensions regarding the new curfew and young people's protests against it.

== Etymology ==
The exact history of the word "Marukos" is debated, but scholars generally agree that the name is probably linked to the ilocano word "agrikosrikos" (to go around in circles, to meander). Ilocano historians have also linked it to the words "parikot" (trouble or hardship) and "agparubbok" (to spring up). Some have also linked it to the Tagalog word "Maloko" (tricksy), and to "Moro", a reference to the Moro people who were feared among the Ilocanos in Colonial times.

It was first referenced by Juan Francisco Maura in 1575, who spelled the word as "Morrucos". Later Spanish-era accounts used the word "Manrucos." Modern accounts of the demon refer to it as Marukus or Marrukus, the variation in the spelling being largely a matter of contemporary Ilocano orthography.

== See also ==
- Rosario, La Union
- Padsan River
- Amburayan River
- Bued River
- Ilocano people
