= Bagri =

Bagri may refer to:

- Something from, or related to the Bagar region of India
- Bagri language, a Rajasthani language spoken in the Bagar region
- Bagri clan, the name of several lineages of the Bagar region
- Bagri camel, a breed of camel
- Bagrinagar, a village in Rajasthan, India

== People with the name ==
- Ajaib Singh Bagri, Indian-Canadian terrorist
- Mani Ram Bagri (1920–2012), Indian politician
- Raj Bagri, Baron Bagri (1930–2017), Indian-born British businessman and politician

== See also ==
- Bagar (region)
- Bagar (disambiguation)
- Baghri, a social group of India
