= Bangar =

Bangar may refer to one (or more) of the following:

== Geology ==
- Khadir and Bangar, alluvial soil types in India and Pakistan

== Places ==
- Mukim Bangar, a mukim sub-division in Brunei Darussalam
- Bangar, Brunei, a town in Mukim Bangar in Brunei Darussalam
- Bangar, India, a town in Rajasthan, India
- Bangar, Iran (disambiguation), places in Iran
- Bangar, La Union, a municipality in the Philippines

== People ==
- Bangar (caste), a Hindu and Sikh group of India

== Surname ==
- Bangar (surname), a Sanjay Bangar Cricketer

== See also ==
- Bangaram (disambiguation)
- Bangari (disambiguation)
- Bagar (disambiguation)
- Banger (disambiguation)
