= Amburayan River =

River in Luzon, Philippines

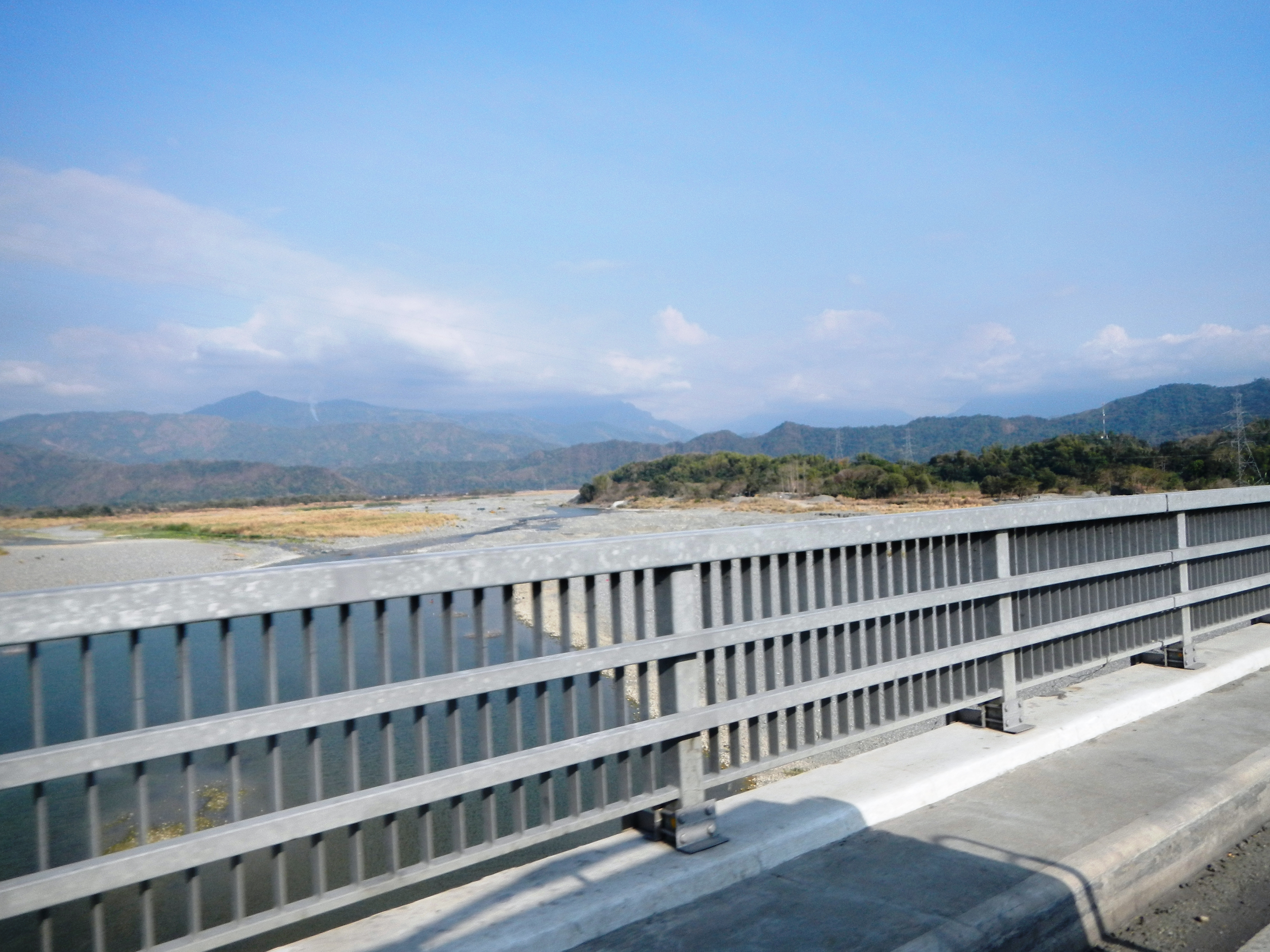
- View from the Amburayan Bridge along Manila North Road

- Amburayan River mouth Amburayan River (Philippines)

Location
- Country: Philippines
- Region: Cordillera Administrative Region; Ilocos Region
- Province: Benguet; La Union; Ilocos Sur
- City/municipality: Kibungan; Atok; Kapangan; Sugpon; San Gabriel; Santol; Sudipen; Alilem; Tagudin; Bangar

Physical characteristics
- Source: Cordillera Mountains
  - location: Mount Osdung Kibungan, Benguet
  - elevation: 8,586 ft (2,617 m)
- Mouth: South China Sea
  - location: Tagudin, Ilocos Sur; Bangar, La Union
  - coordinates: 16°55′15.7″N 120°24′39″E
  - elevation: 0 m (0 ft)
- Length: 96 km (60 mi)
- Basin size: 1,319 km^{2} (509 sq mi)

Basin features
- Tributaries
  - right: Bakun River

The Amburayan River is a river in the northwestern portion of island of Luzon in the Philippines. It originates from the Cordillera mountains and traverses the provinces of Benguet, La Union, and Ilocos Sur, with a total length of 96 km (60 mi), emptying into the South China Sea. It is believed to be one of the longest rivers in northern Luzon. The river serves as the boundary between the provinces of Ilocos Sur and La Union.

== Source and course ==
The river's headwaters are a confluence of smaller creeks along the south of barangay Lubo, in Kibungan. Several other tributary creeks merge with the river as it flows along Atok and Kapangan. It then flows along the Sugpon–San Gabriel boundary, the Sugpon–Santol boundary, the Sugpon–Sudipen boundary, the Sudipen–Alilem boundary, the Sudipen–Tagudin boundary, and finally at the Tagudin–Bangar boundary, where its river mouth is located.

== Crossings ==
This is listed from mouth to source.

- Amburayan Bridge ( N2 (Manila North Road), Tagudin, Ilocos Sur–Bangar, La Union boundary)
- Amburayan Friendship Bridge (Sudipen–Alilem Road, Sudipen, La Union–Alilem, Ilocos Sur boundary)
- Sugpon Bridge (Sugpon Road, Sudipen, La Union–Sugpon, Ilocos Sur boundary)
- Amburayan Bridge (Acop–Kapangan–Kibungan–Bakun Road, Kapangan, Benguet )
- Ambiladen Bridge (Acop–Kapangan–Kibungan–Bakun Road Kibungan, Benguet)

== In culture ==
In the Ilocano epic Biag ni Lam-ang, the hero Lam-ang came to bathe in the Amburayan as he was soaked in dirt and blood after a battle with headhunters. With the aid of young women from a neighboring village, he undertook the task of removing the contaminants, consisting of soil and blood, that had fouled the river's waters, resulting in the demise of aquatic life within its ecosystem.
