= Sudipen =

Municipality in La Union, Philippines

- Municipality
- Municipality of Sudipen
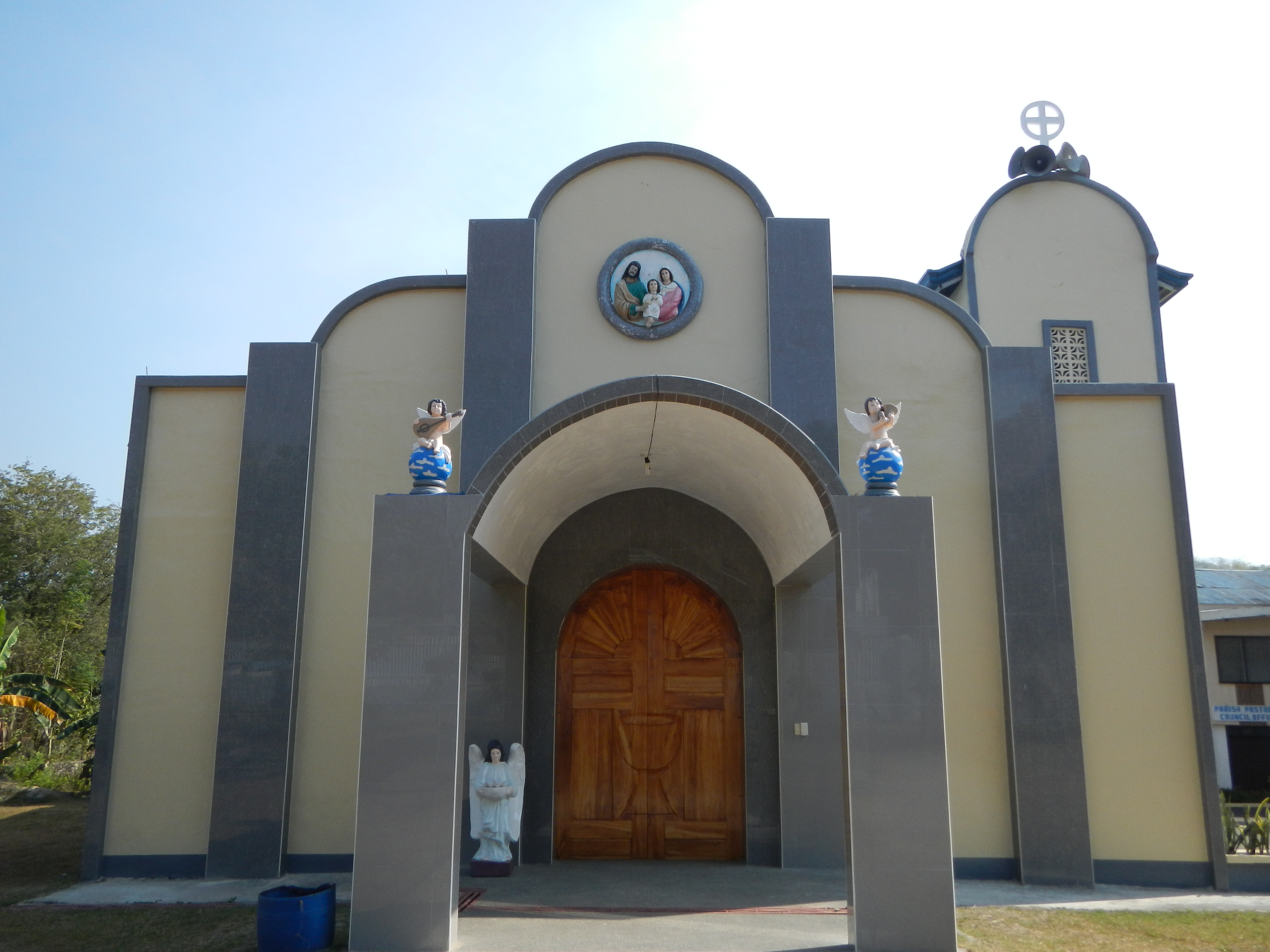
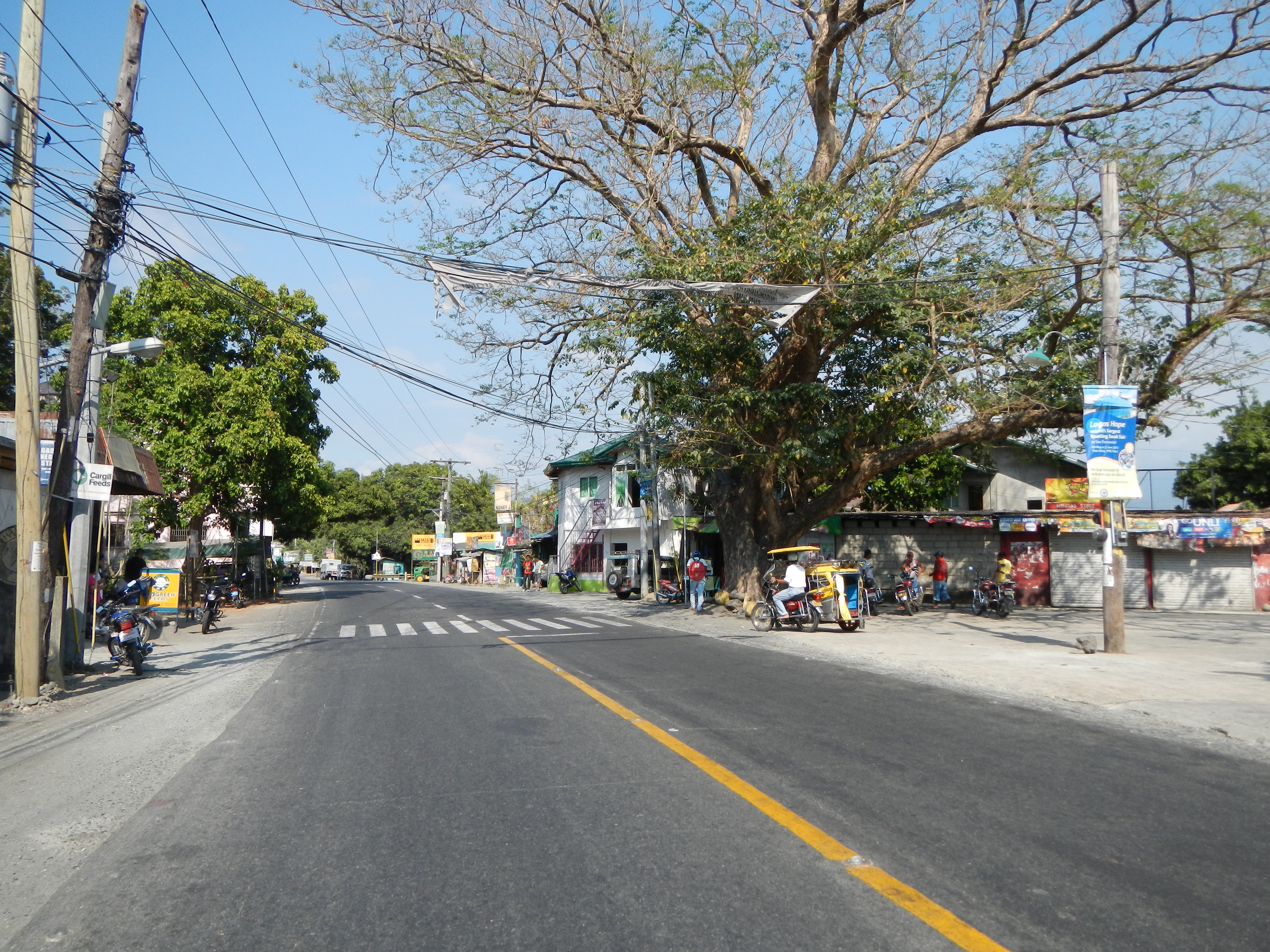
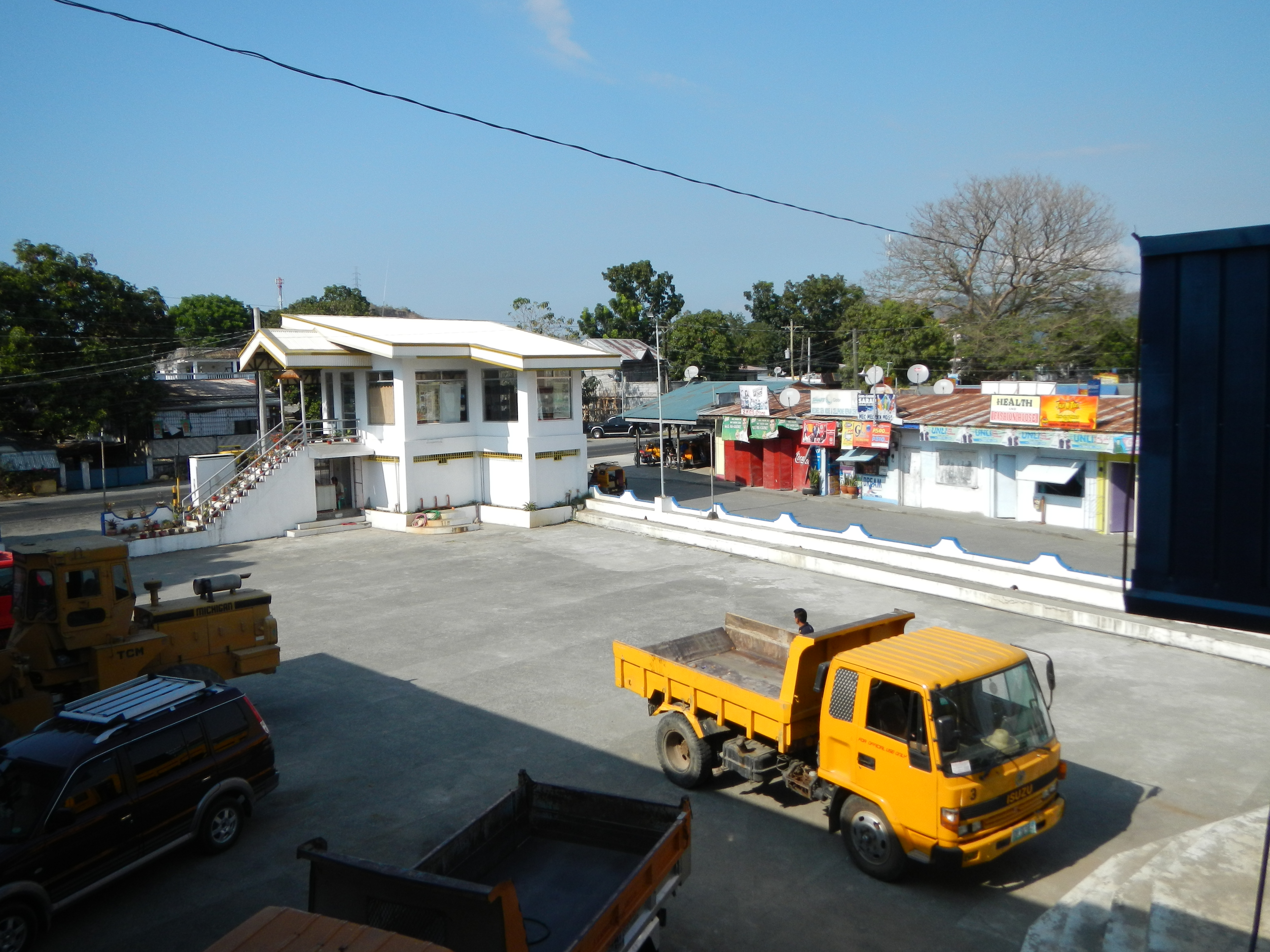
- Sudipen Downtown area

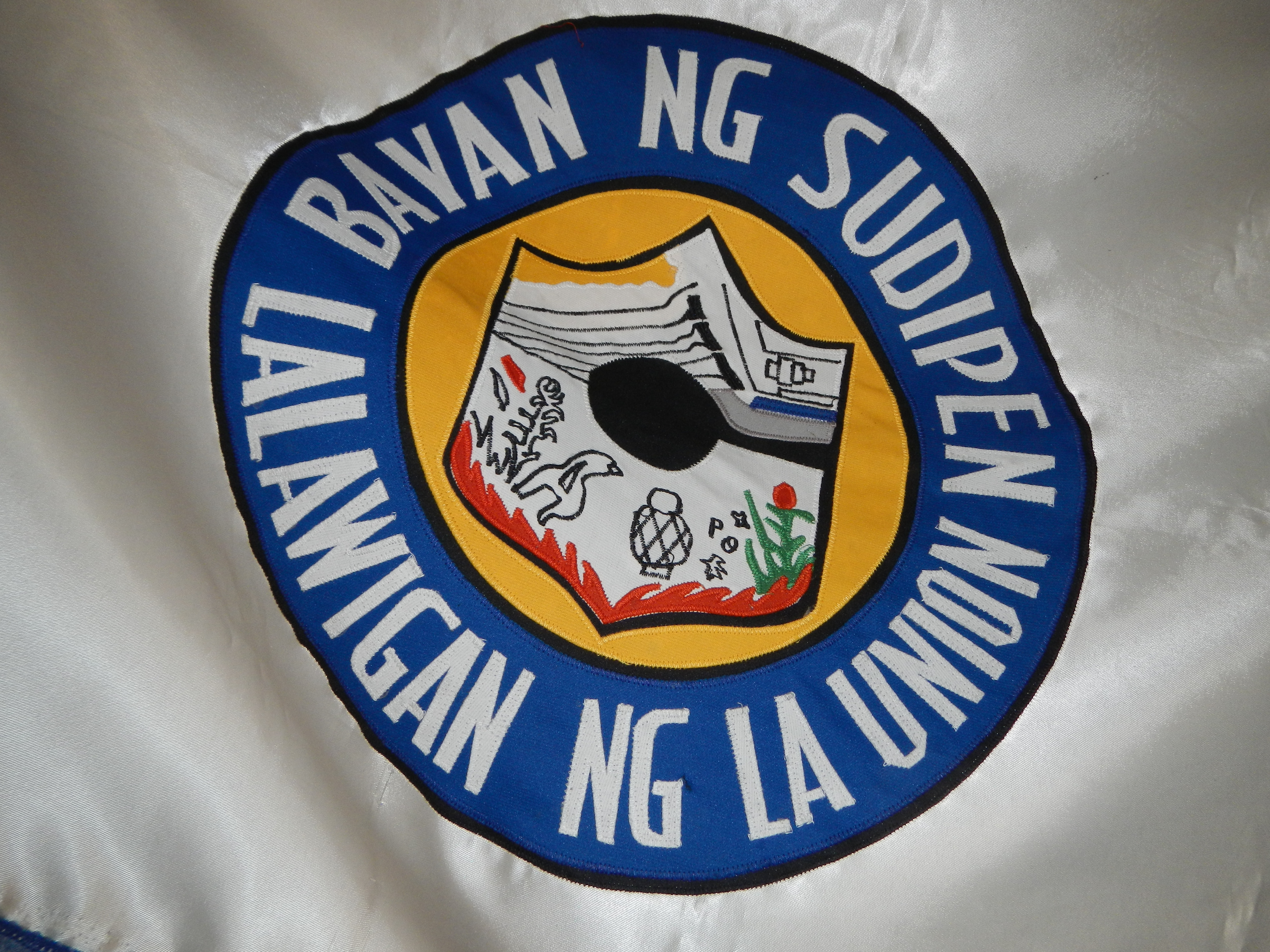
- Flag Seal

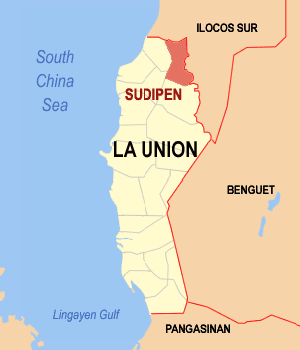
- Map of La Union with Sudipen highlighted
- Interactive map of Sudipen
- Location within the Philippines
- Coordinates: 16°54′N 120°28′E
- Country: Philippines
- Region: Ilocos Region
- Province: La Union
- District: 1st district
- Barangays: 17 (see Barangays)

Government
  - Type: Sangguniang Bayan
  - Mayor: Wendy Joy D. Buquing
  - Vice Mayor: Melvin G. Macusi
  - Representative: Francisco Paolo P. Ortega V
  - Municipal Council: Members: Tita D. Mostoles; Erwin M. Belisoa Jr.; Joebet L. Dee; Demie L. Danguecan; Thelma R. Peña; Bery A. Yadao; Marcelina P. Leonen; Yna P. Castro
  - Electorate: 13,455 voters (2025)

Area
  - Total: 97.59 km^{2} (37.68 sq mi)
- Elevation: 70 m (230 ft)
- Highest elevation: 443 m (1,453 ft)
- Lowest elevation: 0 m (0 ft)

Population (2024 census)
  - Total: 16,888
  - Density: 173.1/km^{2} (448.2/sq mi)
  - Households: 4,238

Economy
  - Income class: 1st municipal income class
  - Poverty incidence: 8.95% (2023)
  - Revenue: ₱ 470.4 million (2024)
  - Assets: ₱ 954.3 million (2024)
  - Expenditure: ₱ 196 million (2024)
  - Liabilities: ₱ 132 million (2024)

Service provider
  - Electricity: La Union Electric Cooperative (LUELCO)
- Time zone: UTC+8 (PST)
- ZIP code: 2520
- PSGC: 0103319000
- IDD : area code: +63 (0)72
- Native languages: Ilocano; Tagalog
- Website: www.sudipenlaunion.gov.ph

Sudipen (Southern Ilocano pronunciation: [suˈdipɯn]), officially the Municipality of Sudipen (Ilocano: Ili ti Sudipen; Filipino: Bayan ng Sudipen), is a landlocked municipality in the northernmost province of La Union, Philippines. According to the 2024 census, it has a population of 16,888 people.

It is separated from the Amburayan River and is known for its bamboo basket weaving industry.

== Etymology ==
The name "Sudipen" originated from the Spanish colonial period. According to local history, a group of Spanish soldiers reached a barrio known today as Old Central, where they encountered villagers repairing the roof of a barrio hall. When the soldiers asked for the name of the place, the villagers, misunderstanding the question, responded in Iloco language: “suksukdipan mi toy abong apo,” meaning, “we are patching the roof, sir.” The soldiers recorded the word "Sukdipan," which was later modified to "Sudipen" under the American regime.

== History ==
Sudipen was originally a settlement for cultural minorities from the Mountain Province. Early settlers primarily consisted of the Kankanaey and Bago tribes, who lived along the Amburayan River and the foothills of the Cordillera Central.

During the Spanish colonization, Sudipen was a barrio of Bangar, La Union. In 1906, Bartolome Laoagan Apusen, a notable leader from Pias, Salcedo, Ilocos Sur, organized the area into a township under the province of Lepanto-Bontoc with the sub-province of Amburayan. He was instrumental in rallying the support of the locals to gain recognition as a formal township, paving the way for its eventual growth.

The town endured challenges during the Philippine Revolution against Spain and the subsequent Philippine-American War, during which local leaders and tribespeople resisted external control. The Amburayan River served as both a natural defense and a supply route for the locals during these turbulent times. The area witnessed gradual development under American rule, including the establishment of schools and basic infrastructure.

By 1917, the area of Amburayan was greatly reduced with the enactment of Act No. 2711, or the Revised Administrative Code of the Philippine Islands. The law placed Sudipen under the jurisdiction of La Union together with municipal districts of San Gabriel and Santol.

By virtue of Executive Order No. 72 signed by President Manuel Roxas on July 30, 1947, Sudipen, along with San Gabriel and Pugo, was officially organized into a regular municipality. On August 17, 1947, it was reclassified as a sixth-class municipality of La Union, increasing the number of the province’s municipalities to 17.

== Geography ==
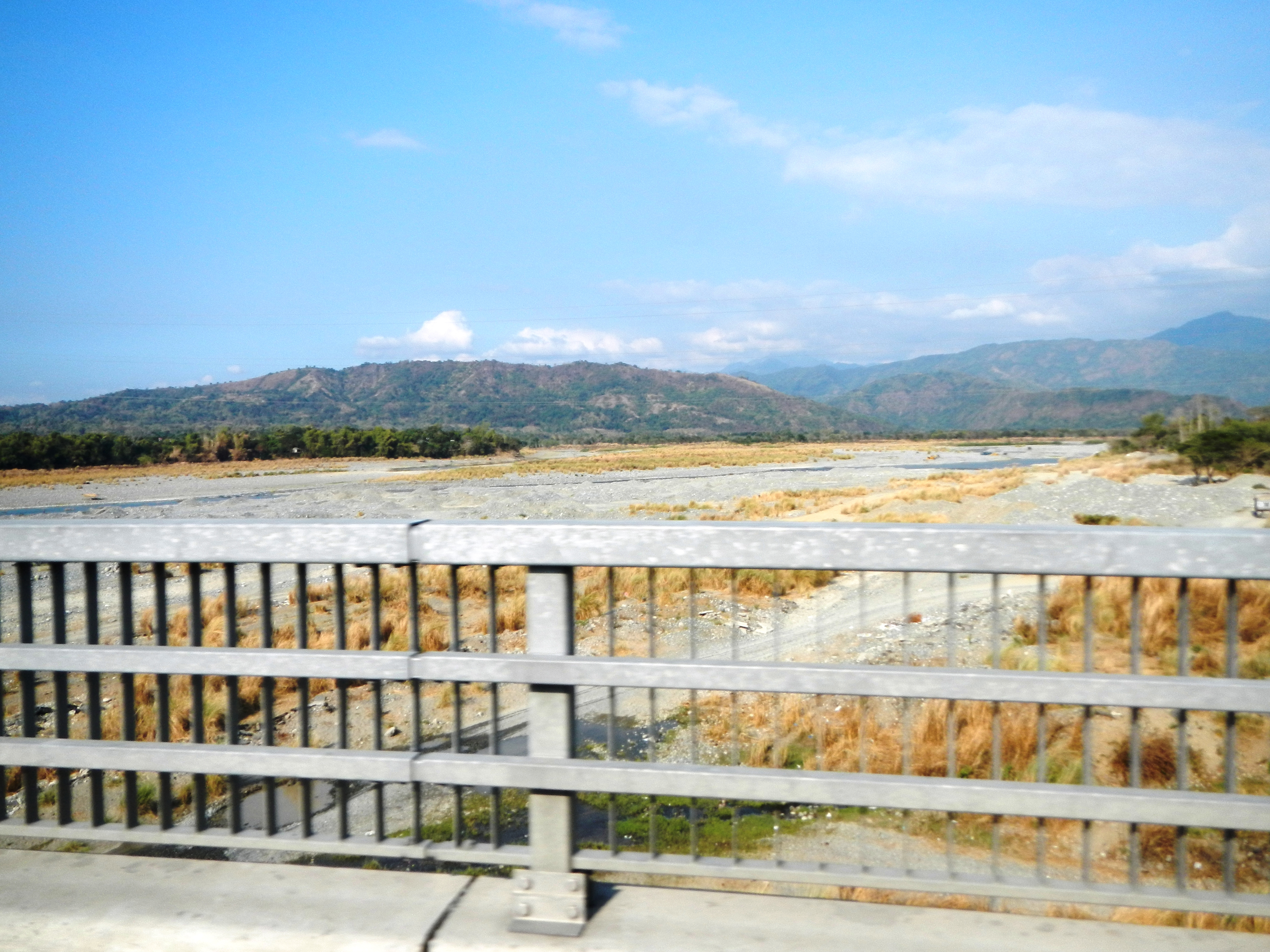
Amburayan River

The Municipalioty of Sudipen has a total land area of 10,048.714978 hectares, making it the fifth-largest municipality in La Union.

The town's geography is shaped by two major rivers: the Amburayan River, which marks its northern and eastern boundaries, and the Lalonga or Chico River, which flows through the barangays of Bigbiga, Bulalaan, and Maliclico. These rivers are vital for agricultural and domestic needs and also supply water to neighboring towns like Bangar, Luna, and Balaoan.

It is bordered by Bangar to the northwest, Balaoan to the southwest, Tagudin to the north, Alilem to the northeast, and Sugpon to the southeast in the province of Ilocos Sur, with the Amburayan River serving as the boundary, and lastly Santol to the south.

Sudipen is situated 41.98 kilometres (26.09 mi) from the provincial capital San Fernando, and 308.42 kilometres (191.64 mi) from the country's capital city of Manila.

=== Barangays ===
Sudipen is politically subdivided into 17 barangays. Five are upland barangays, while 12 are in the lowlands. Each barangay consists of puroks and some have sitios. Barangay Bulalaan is the largest barangay, covering 8,988 hectares (22,210 acres), while Barangay Poblacion is the smallest, with an area of only 82 hectares (200 acres).

- Bigbiga
- Bulalaan
- Castro
- Duplas
- Ilocano
- Ipet
- Maliclico
- Namaltugan
- Old Central (Nagpanaoan)
- Poblacion
- Porporiket
- San Francisco Norte
- San Francisco Sur
- San Jose
- Sengngat
- Turod
- Up-uplas

=== Climate ===
Climate data for Sudipen, La Union
Month	Jan	Feb	Mar	Apr	May	Jun	Jul	Aug	Sep	Oct	Nov	Dec	Year
Mean daily maximum °C (°F)	30 (86)	31 (88)	33 (91)	33 (91)	32 (90)	31 (88)	30 (86)	30 (86)	30 (86)	31 (88)	31 (88)	31 (88)	31 (88)
Mean daily minimum °C (°F)	20 (68)	21 (70)	23 (73)	25 (77)	26 (79)	25 (77)	25 (77)	25 (77)	25 (77)	23 (73)	22 (72)	21 (70)	23 (74)
Average precipitation mm (inches)	27 (1.1)	31 (1.2)	40 (1.6)	71 (2.8)	207 (8.1)	237 (9.3)	286 (11.3)	261 (10.3)	261 (10.3)	254 (10.0)	88 (3.5)	46 (1.8)	1,809 (71.3)
Average rainy days	9.4	9.3	12.7	17.0	25.4	26.8	27.4	26.1	25.0	21.0	15.5	10.6	226.2
Source: Meteoblue

== Demographics ==
Population census of Sudipen
Year	Pop.	±% p.a.
1918	3,569	—
1939	6,039	+2.54%
1948	6,922	+1.53%
1960	7,926	+1.13%
1970	9,785	+2.13%
1975	10,430	+1.29%
1980	10,796	+0.69%
1990	13,043	+1.91%
1995	14,075	+1.44%
2000	15,099	+1.52%
2007	15,949	+0.76%
2010	16,531	+1.31%
2015	17,056	+0.60%
2020	17,187	+0.16%
2024	16,888	−0.42%
Source: Philippine Statistics Authority

In the 2020 census, the population of Sudipen was 17,187 people, with a density of 180 inhabitants per square kilometre or 470 inhabitants per square mile.

== Economy ==
Poverty incidence of Sudipen (%)

Source: Philippine Statistics Authority

== Government ==
=== Local government ===
Sudipen, belonging to the first congressional district of the province of La Union, is governed by a mayor designated as its local chief executive and by a municipal council as its legislative body in accordance with the Local Government Code. The mayor, vice mayor, and the councilors are elected directly by the people through an election which is being held every three years.

=== Elected officials ===
Members of the Municipal Council (2019–2022)
Position	Name
Congressman	Pablo C. Ortega
Mayor	Wendy Joy D. Buquing
Vice-Mayor	Melvin G. Macusi
Councilors	Tita D. Mostoles
Councilors	Edwin M. Belisoa Jr.
Councilors	Joebet L. Dee
Councilors	Demy L. Danguecan
Councilors	Thelma R. Peña
Councilors	Bery A. Yadao
Councilors	Marcelina P. Leonen
Councilors	Yna P. Castro

== Education ==
The Sudipen Schools District Office governs all educational institutions within the municipality. It oversees the management and operations of all private and public elementary and high schools.

=== Primary and elementary schools ===
- Badang Elementary School
- Basig Elementary School
- Castro Elementary School
- Duplas Elementary School
- Maliclico Elementary School
- Old Sudipen Elementary School
- Porporiket Elementary School
- San Francisco Elementary School
- San Jose Elementary School
- Sengngat Elementary School
- Sudipen Central School
- Up-uplas Elementary School

=== Secondary schools ===
- Duplas National High School
- Old Sudipen National High School
- San Francisco National High School
- Sudipen Vocational High School

== Gallery ==
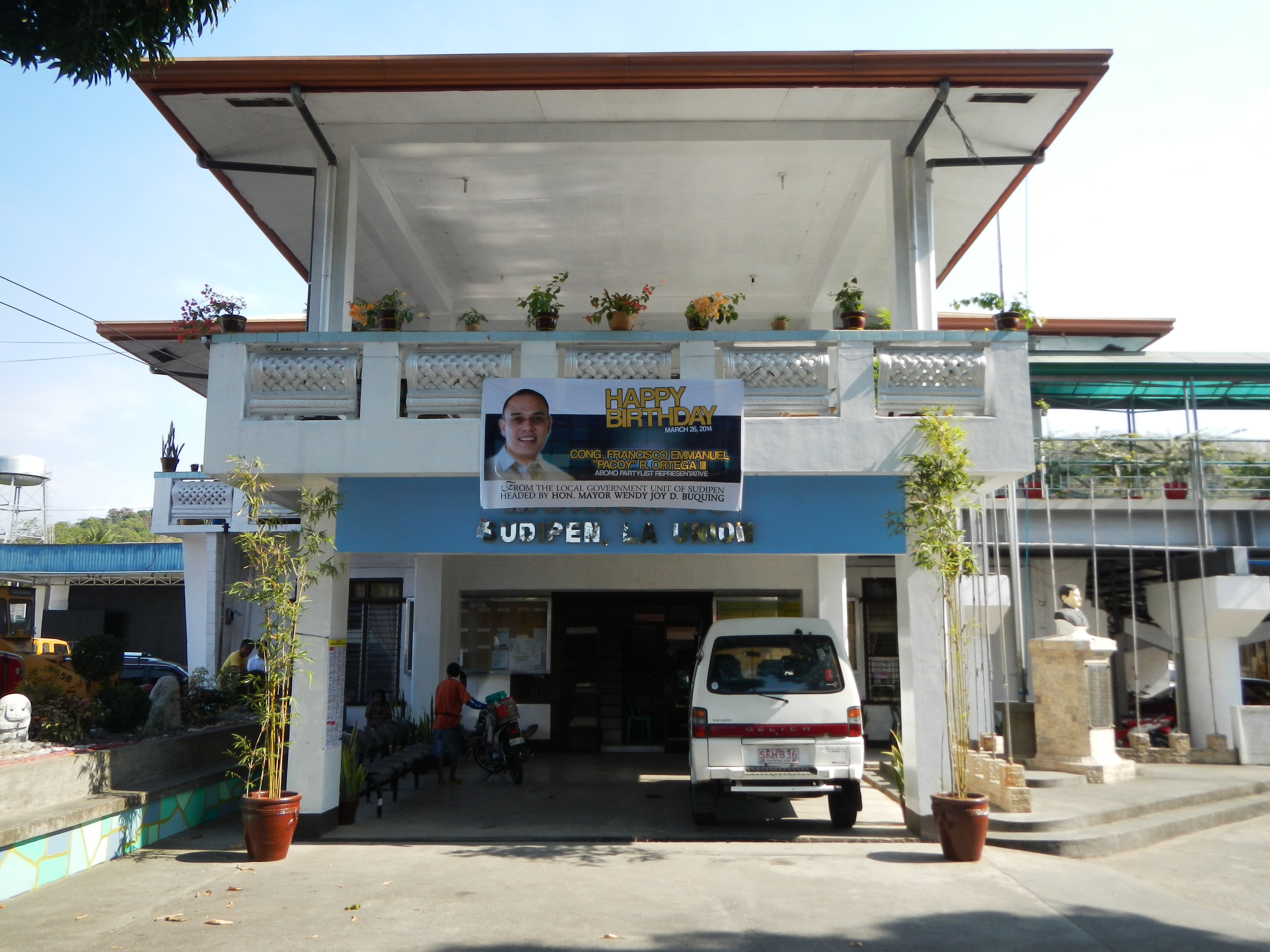
Municipal hall

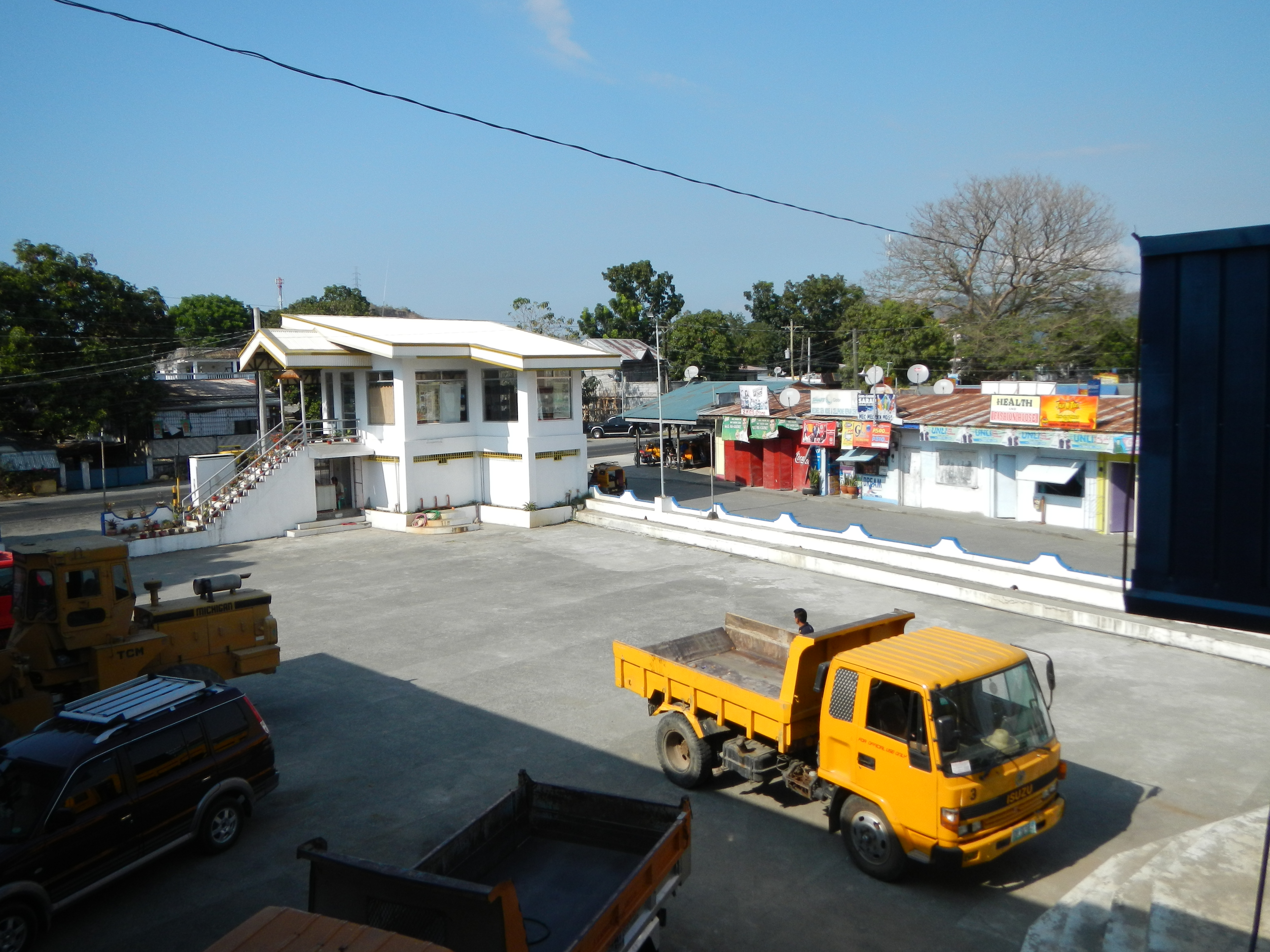
Town center

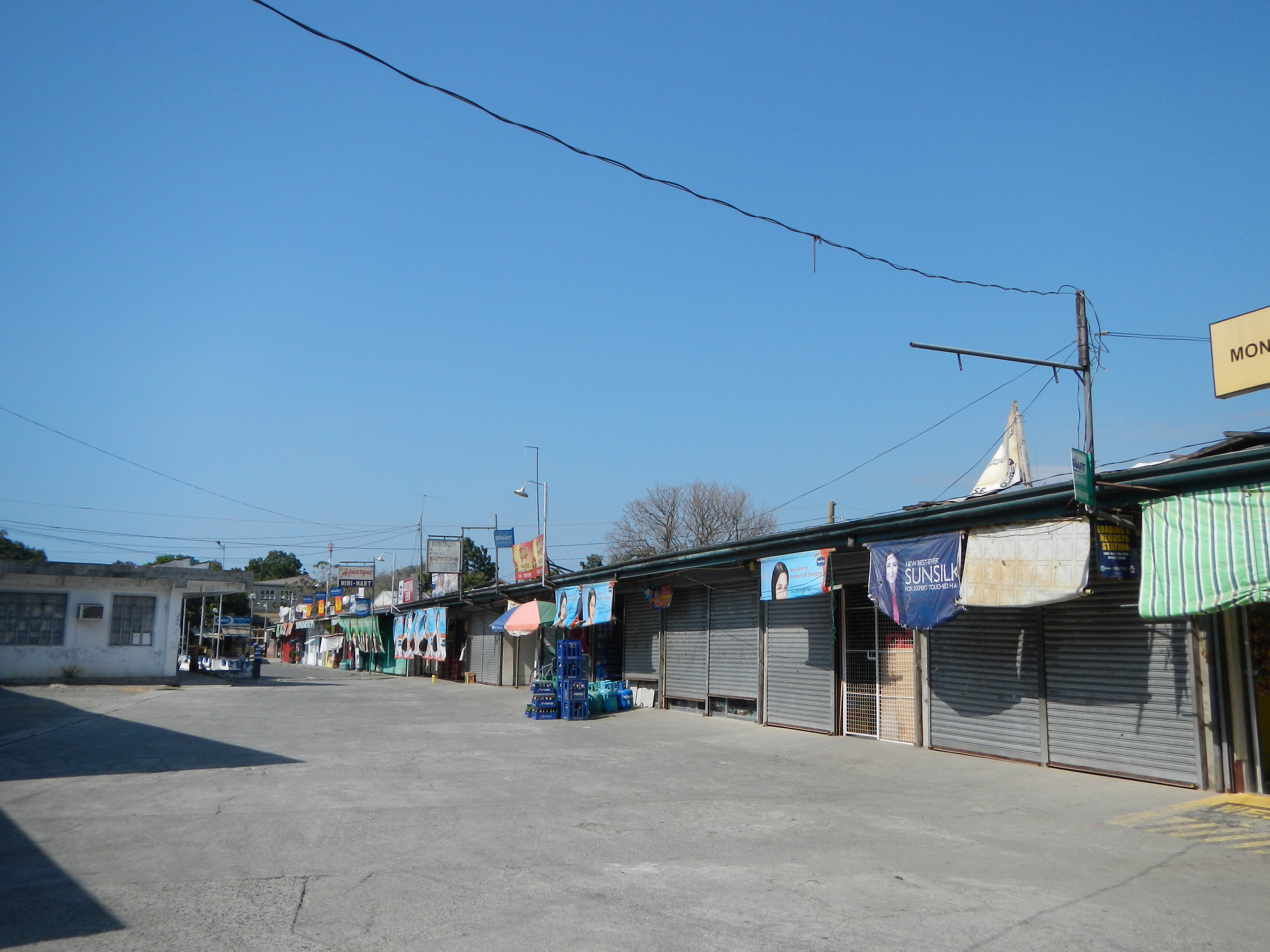
Sudipen Farmers Public Market

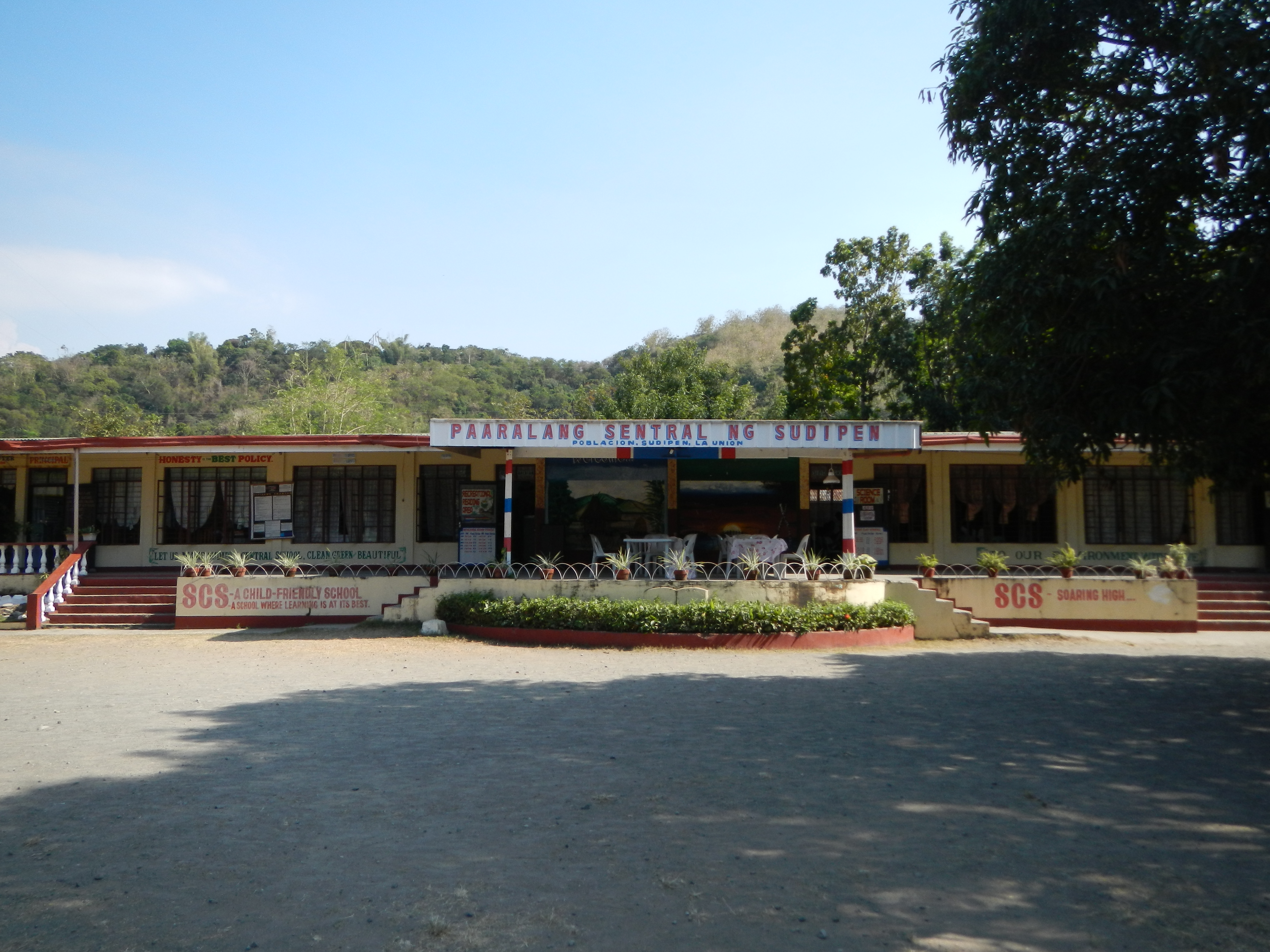
Sudipen Central School

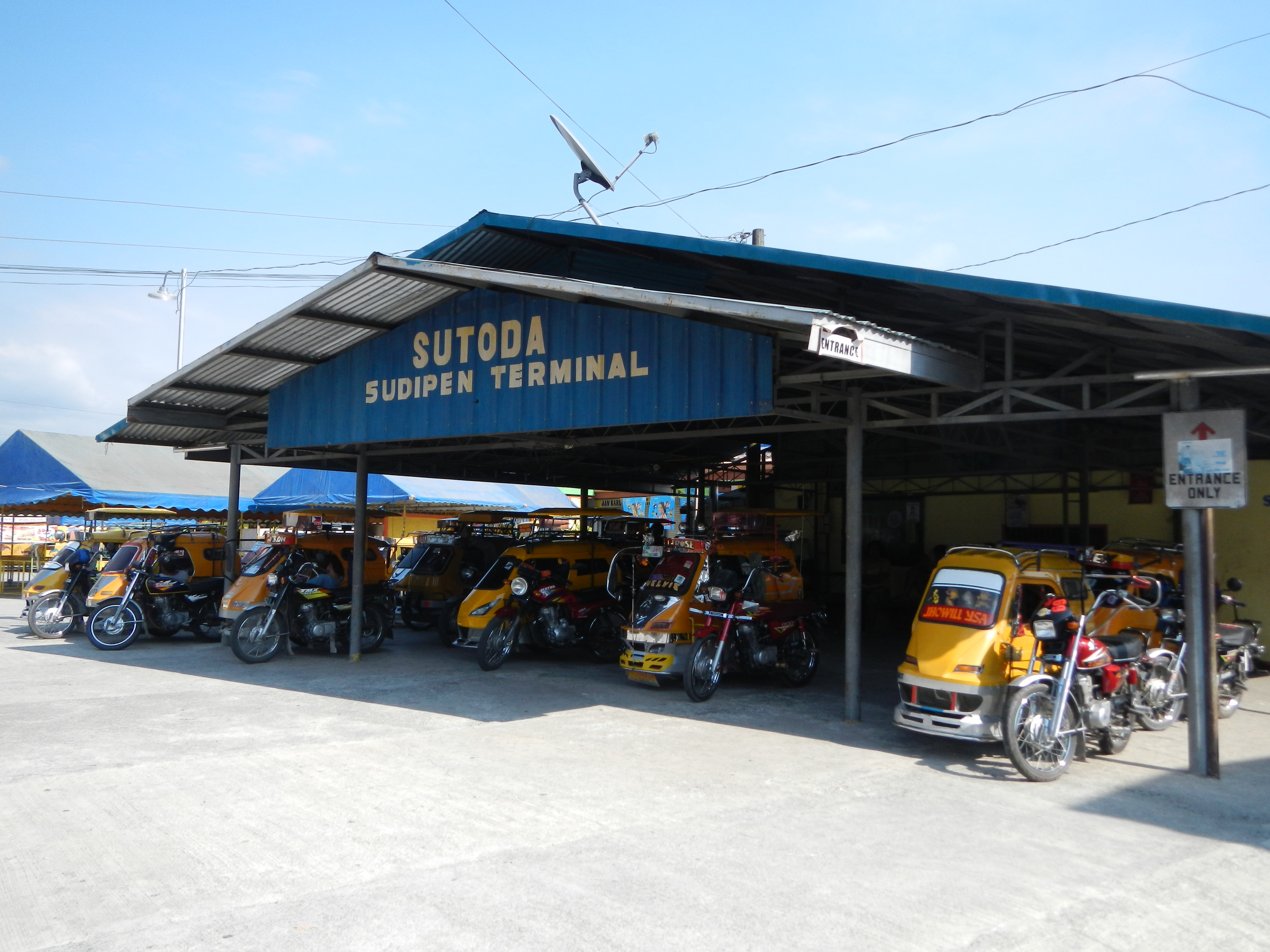
Sudipen terminal
