= Bangari =

Bangari may refer to:

- Bangari (2013 film), an Indian Kannada-language romantic film
- Bangari (1963 film), an Indian Kannada-language film
- Bangari, Uttar Pradesh, a village in Jhansi district of Uttar Pradesh State, India
- Bangari railway station, a halt railway station on the Muzaffarpur–Gorakhpur main line in Bihar, India

== See also ==
- Bangar (disambiguation)
- Bangaram (disambiguation)
