= Bangaram (disambiguation) =

Bangaram primarily refers to:

- Bangaram Atoll in the Lakshadweep archipelago of India

Bangaram may also refer to:

- Bangaram (film) a Telugu language film
- Bangaram class patrol vessels of the Indian Navy
- INS Bangaram (T65), the lead vessel of the Bangaram class patrol vessels

== See also ==
- Bangar (disambiguation)
- Bangari (disambiguation)
