= Bagar =

Bagar may refer to:

- Arpunk, Armenia, also called Bagar
- Bagar, China, in the Tibet Autonomous Region
- Bagar region, the sandy tract of western Haryana, eastern Rajasthan and western Punjab in India
  - Bagri language, the language spoken in Bagar region of India
- Bagar, Jhunjhunu, village in Jhunjhunu district, Rajasthan, India
- Bagar, Pauri Garhwal, a village in Uttarakhand, India
- Bagar, also Chaunk, a common word used in India cuisine meaning 'seasoning'
- Bagar, Pokhara, a ward in Pokhara Metropolitan City in Nepal

== See also ==
- Bangar (disambiguation)
- Bagri (disambiguation)
