= Bagri camel =

Breed of camel

The Bagri is a breed of camel originating in the arid regions of south-eastern Punjab, Pakistan. The strain found in Multan is known as the Multan camel, while the strain of Dera Ghazi Khan goes by the name of Rojhan camel. The Bagri is commonly used for transport in the region and it is known to be excellent for riding and racing. Good specimens of this breed are said to give such a smooth ride that one can read a book while riding or carry a glass of water without spilling it.
