= Bangar, La Union =

Municipality in La Union, Philippines

Bangar
- Municipality
- Municipality of Bangar
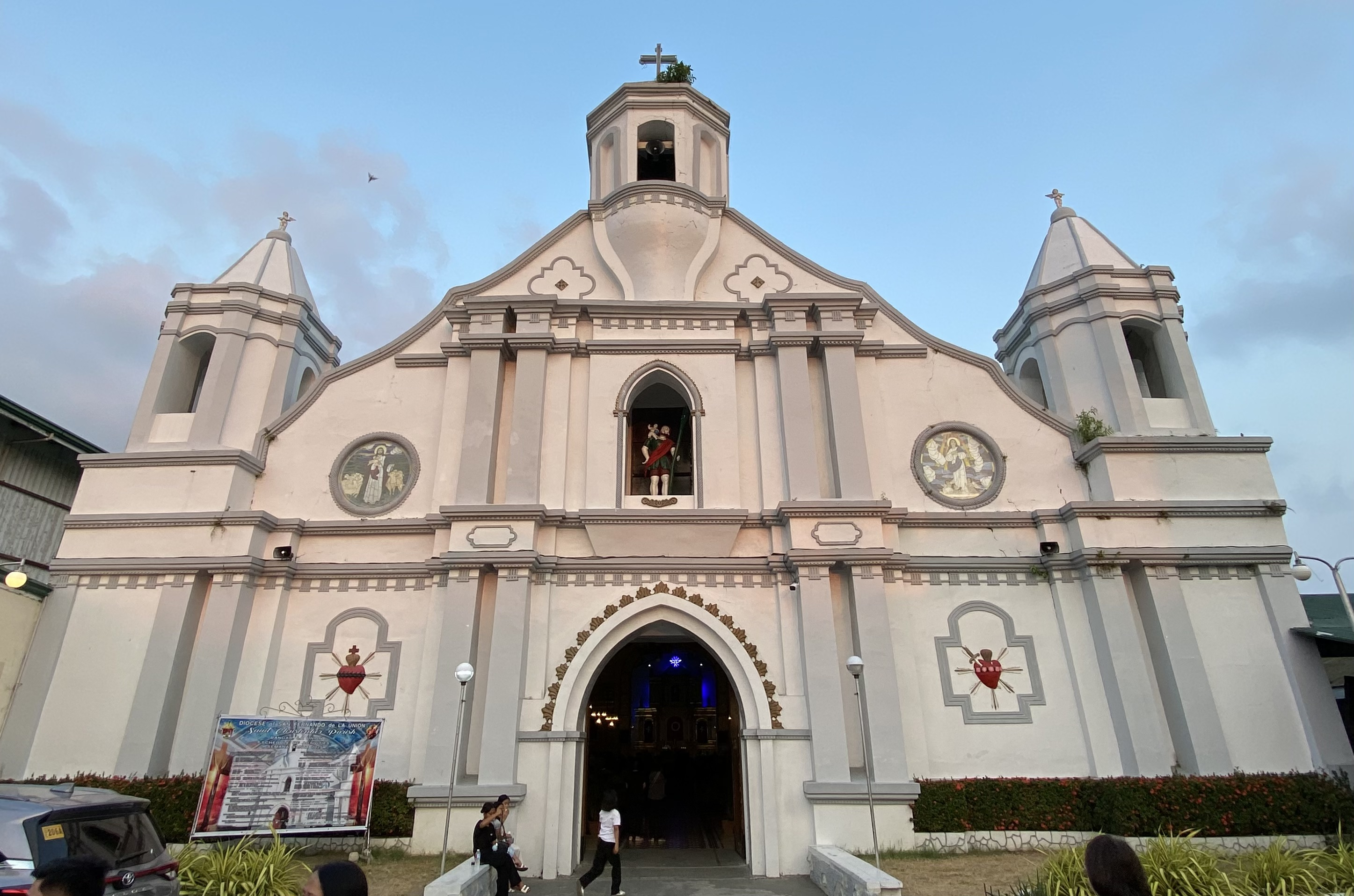
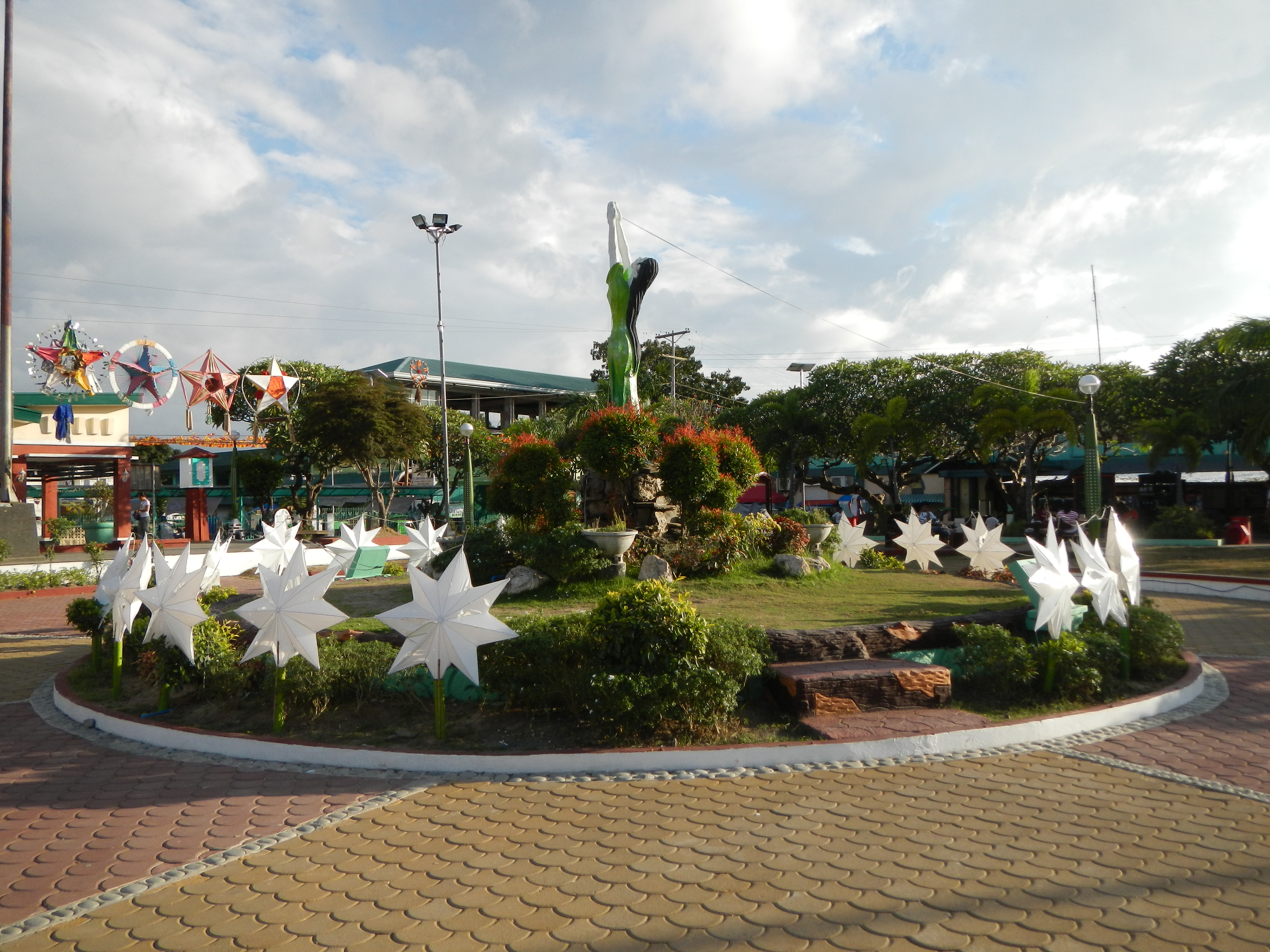
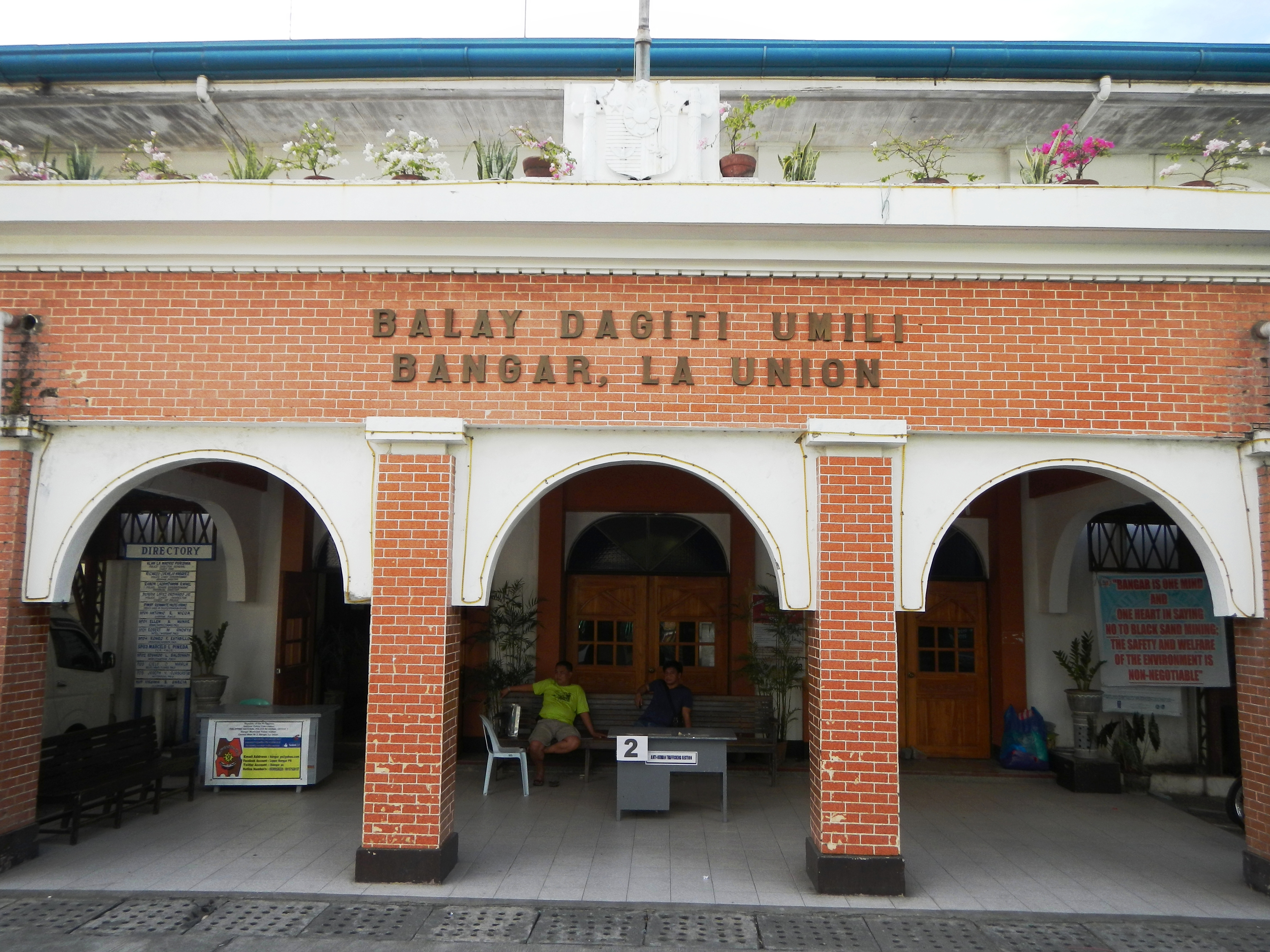
- St. Christopher Parish Church, Bangar Town Plaza and Bangar Municipal Hall

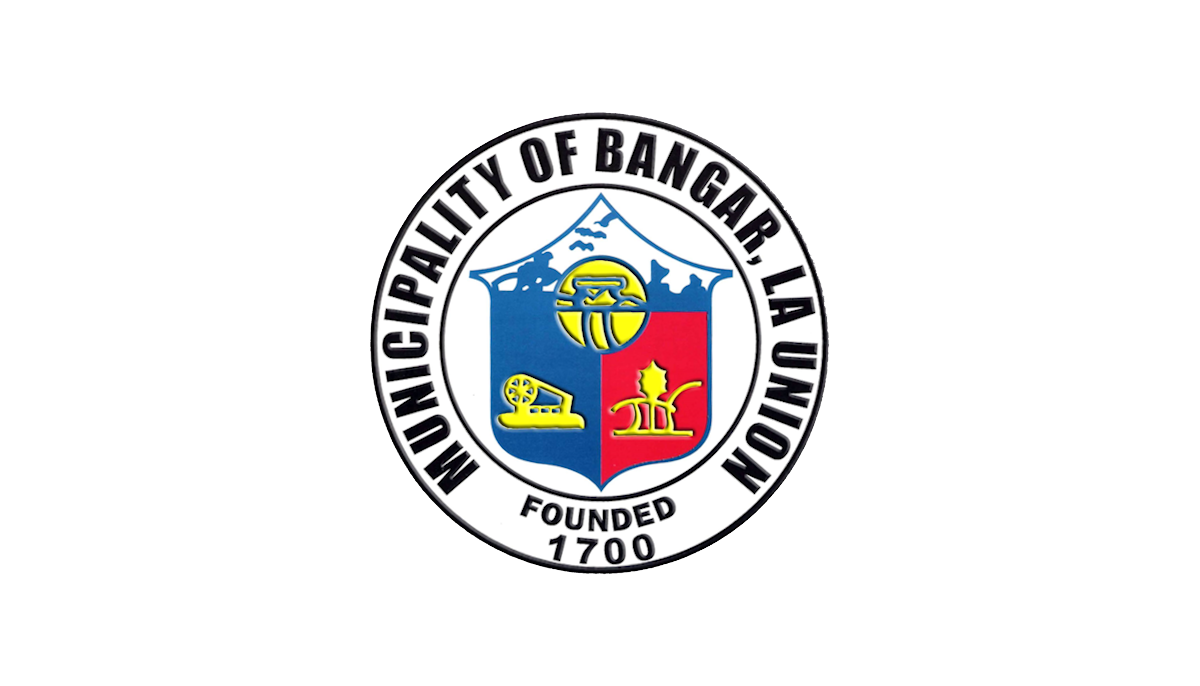
- Flag Seal

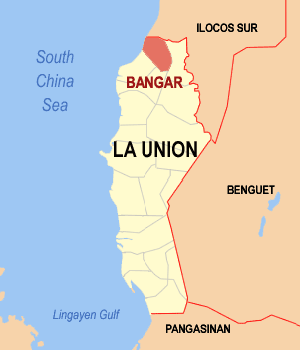
- Map of La Union with Bangar highlighted
- Interactive map of Bangar
- Location within the Philippines
- Coordinates: 16°53′35″N 120°25′23″E
- Country: Philippines
- Region: Ilocos Region
- Province: La Union
- District: 1st district
- Founded: 1700
- Barangays: 33 (see Barangays)

Government
  - Type: Sangguniang Bayan
  - Mayor: Joy P. Merin
  - Vice Mayor: Virgelio M. Dabalos
  - Representative: Pablo C. Ortega
  - Municipal Council: Members: Wilfredo R. Mosuela; Michael M. Viray; Rogelio F. Coloma; Mario L. Makiling; Emmanuel A. Mantilla; Eduardo P. Flores; Anthony J. Taguiam; Anacleto L. Yukee
  - Electorate: 23,240 voters (2025)

Area
  - Total: 37.36 km^{2} (14.42 sq mi)
- Elevation: 21 m (69 ft)
- Highest elevation: 275 m (902 ft)
- Lowest elevation: 0 m (0 ft)

Population (2024 census)
  - Total: 38,190
  - Density: 1,022/km^{2} (2,648/sq mi)
  - Households: 9,485

Economy
  - Income class: 1st municipal income class
  - Poverty incidence: 10.14% (2023)
  - Revenue: ₱ 276.2 million (2024)
  - Assets: ₱ 1,107 million (2024)
  - Expenditure: ₱ 244.4 million (2024)
  - Liabilities: ₱ 263.1 million (2024)

Service provider
  - Electricity: La Union Electric Cooperative (LUELCO)
- Time zone: UTC+8 (PST)
- ZIP code: 2519
- PSGC: 0103306000
- IDD : area code: +63 (0)72
- Native languages: Ilocano; Tagalog
- Website: www.bangar.gov.ph

Bangar, officially the Municipality of Bangar (Ilocano: Ili ti Bangar; Filipino: Bayan ng Bangar), is a coastal municipality in the province of La Union, Philippines. According to the 2024 census, it has a population of 38,190 people.

The town known for its loom-weaving or "abel", and blacksmithing or "panday" industries.

== Etymology ==
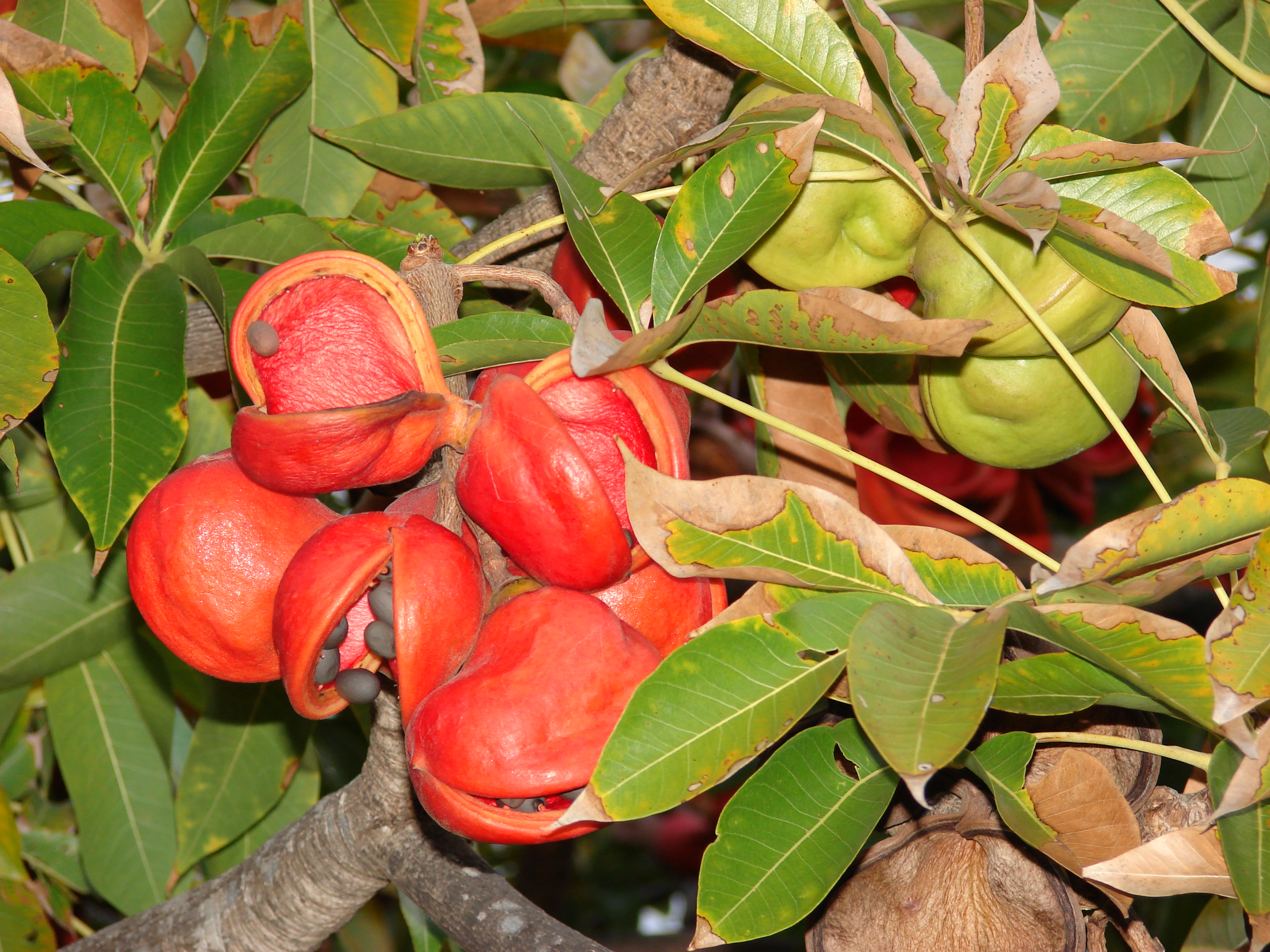
Bangar tree (Sterculia foetida) fruits & leaves

The name Bangar is derived from the bangar tree (Sterculia foetida), a species that once thrived in the area now occupied by the town. The bangar tree is characterized by its flowers, which emit a distinct foul odor. Despite this, the tree was historically significant for its various uses. Its wood was highly valued for crafting interior boards of houses, while its fruits, when soaked in oil, were used to produce a deep red dye for handwoven textiles. The tree also held cultural importance, as its large canopy provided a gathering space for the "indios infieles" a term used by Spanish colonizers to describe non-Christianized natives who performed traditional rituals beneath its shade.

== History ==
1700 marked the official foundation of Bangar when it became a mission field under the patronage of Saint Christopher. However, Christianity was brought as early as the latter part of the 16th century, when Bangar, with a community of 2,800 inhabitants, was still a visita (chapelry) of Tagudin. The highly skilled, industrious, and peace-loving people were primarily engaged in rice and cotton planting. The beautiful and sturdy handwoven products made by the women of that time even found their way to Europe and it was said that some of these materials were used as boat sails by European seamen. Among the more famous handwoven products made by them were blankets bearing different designs, clothing materials, and mosquito nets. Since chemicals for coloring were very scarce those days, the bark of trees and fruit were used to dye those handwoven products.

The old town was made of three pueblitos (small towns) namely: Villa-Cruz, San Rafael, and San Anastacio. Near these pueblitos were small communities of Igorotes Infieles who paid tribute to the Governor.

Through the Superior Decreto (Executive Decree) signed by Governor-General Antonio Maria Blanco on March 2, 1850, the town of Bangar was made part of the newly created province of La Union. Prior to this, Bangar, Purao (Balaoan) and Namacpacan (Luna) were part of Ilocos Sur. As the years passed by, barrios were formed.

Education during Spanish times consisted of learning the Cartilla and the abecedario. Roman Catholic religion was taught hand-in-hand with good manners. However, formal education was given to students belonging to the upper class. Spanish social life had greatly affected the Indios and in no time, Castilian manners were very evident among them.

The social status of an individual was easily distinguished by the kind of attire one wore. Male peasants were distinguished by their simple camisa de chino and loose pants tied to the waist by braided strings. Female peasants wore simple loose blouses and ankle-length skirts, with a camison, made from cotton fabric, worn underneath. The peasantry were usually barefooted, and if there was anything worn on the feet, it was the kammadang (wooden shoes) or a pair of slippers.

Men of the upper class were distinguished by the barong and camisa de chino made of fine fabric, and trousers cut in the western style. He wore socks and leather shoes and on the head was a hat, which was usually plumed. A walking cane in various styles and colors and encased in gold, silver or bronze was indispensable. He never smoked without using a pipe.

The upper-class lady was very fastidious. She had her hair done in a brushed up coiffure. They curled their hair by using the stem of the papaya leaf and iron rod which was heated over burning charcoal. However, so much care was given using this method. Other women preferred to tie their hair in curls in the evening and untie it in the morning. Ladies wore the "Maria Clara" or the camisa with embroidered and stitched butterfly sleeves and matching panuelo. They used alfiler (pins) made of gold or silver. A comb called peineta, usually fan-shaped and encrusted with silver or gold, adorned their hair. The skirt, which was usually billowy, was made from very fine fabric from China. Underneath she wore a long camison and over it the nuagas. The outer skirt was still topped by beautiful imported lace. A perfumed fan and a big handkerchief trimmed with lace, hanging on the right side of the skirt tucked to her waistline, was part of the attire. On Sundays and holidays of obligation, a mantilla made of lace, which covered the head down to the waist and tucked to the hair by a gold pin was obligatory for the Holy Mass. On the feet, the lady wore a zapatilla, usually half-heeled and adorned with artificial rhinestones. A gold pendant hanging from a gold necklace around the neck was also part of the attire. The tamborine, a gold necklace with intricate designs was also worn on special days.

US-styled education was implemented with the coming of the Americans in 1898. Education had a very high standard then, such that one who finished the fourth grade could teach those who were in the lower years.

The impact of World War II was first felt in Bangar on December 8, 1941, the feast of the Immaculate Conception. A lantern competition, which was sponsored by Rev. Jose Brillantes, the parish priest, was hastily canceled and churchgoers had to hurry home after the Holy Mass as they immediately prepared for evacuation. On December 20, 1941, the Japanese Army entered Bangar. They put up sentries along the national road and also had one at the Municipal building and another at the plaza. The Japanese occupation required all citizens to display and pin small Japanese flags outside the pocket of the shirt or blouse with the name of the holder written in Japanese. According to them, this was to distinguish peaceful citizens from guerrillas.

Sometime in 1944, on the day Bangar was celebrating the birthday of Emperor Hirohito with a program at the town plaza, a truckload of Japanese soldiers arrived with a lone Filipino who was said to have been captured somewhere in Bacnotan. It was told that the Japanese took the Filipino behind the southern school building and ordered him to dig what was to be his own grave. Upon sensing that his hours on earth were counted, the Filipino suddenly grabbed and unsheathed the sword of an officer who was standing nearby and in one hit motion with the sword, the officer almost got beheaded. This stunned the Japanese soldiers and the Filipino was able to escape unhurt. The whole town was gripped in terror since this would mean Japanese reprisals—on December 28, 1944, the Japanese burned many houses in the town proper and raided the camp of the guerrillas in barrio San Cristobal.

The Underground Movement was very strong during the Japanese occupation of Bangar. Many residents joined the guerrillas, who had put up camps in San Cristobal. Further in the mountains at Lonoy, they also joined "Camp 121". Colonel Volkman and Major Agtarap led the guerrilla movement. The arms that were supplied to the guerrillas landed at Paraoir and men had to carry bolos at nighttime.

The first Americans to reach Bangar during its liberation were a certain Captain Roberts with his men.

During the Northern Luzon Campaign, Filipino soldiers and guerrillas of the 121st Infantry Regiment, Philippine Commonwealth Army, USAFIP-NL are started the liberation campaign in Bangar in 1945 and helped by the U.S. liberation forces against Japanese Imperial Army forces towards the end of the war.

Today, Bangar is known for its handwoven cloth called abel and blacksmithing (panday). Its agricultural products include rice, corn, sugar cane, peanuts, sweet potatoes, vegetables, and Virginia tobacco.

== Geography ==
The northernmost town of La Union, alongside Sudipen, Bangar is also the smallest municipality in the province with an area of 3,736 hectares (9,230 acres). It is bounded by the South China Sea to the west, Sudipen to the east, and Balaoan and Luna to the south-west. The Amburayan River flows to the north of Bangar, separating it from Tagudin.

Bangar is situated 37.99 kilometres (23.61 mi) from the provincial capital San Fernando, and 303.85 kilometres (188.80 mi) from the country's capital city of Manila.

=== Barangays ===
Bangar is politically subdivided into 33 baranngays. Each barangay consists of puroks and some have sitios.

- Agdeppa
- Alzate
- Bangaoilan East
- Bangaoilan West
- Barraca
- Cadapli
- Caggao
- Central East No. 1 (Poblacion)
- Central East No. 2 (Poblacion)
- Central West No. 1 (Poblacion)
- Central West No. 2 (Poblacion)
- Central West No. 3 (Poblacion)
- Consuegra
- General Prim East
- General Prim West
- General Terrero
- Luzong Norte
- Luzong Sur
- Maria Cristina East
- Maria Cristina West
- Mindoro
- Nagsabaran
- Paratong No. 3
- Paratong No. 4
- Paratong Norte
- Quintarong
- Reyna Regente
- Rissing
- San Blas
- San Cristobal
- Sinapangan Norte
- Sinapangan Sur
- Ubbog

==== Etymology of Barangay names ====
- Agdeppa – Notorious criminals were once often executed with their arms outstretched, and the place was thus called agdeppa, meaning outstretched arms.
- Alzate – Named after a Spanish colonial officer called General Alzate, who manned the garrison in that place against the local revolucionarios. It is said that the Amburayan River which partly flowed through Bangar was a favourite swimming hole for Spaniards and the early illustrados.
- Bangaoilan – Once called "Anonang", the town was renamed because of the abundance of a poisonous plant called bangaoil.
- Barraca – This barrio was formed from the two sitio of Binyadura and Nagpalcan. Barraca was adopted as the common name after residents of both hamlets signed a pact to end a violent feud.
- Cadapli – This was taken from the Ilokano words cadcadapa ("crawling") and apli ("mat"). This name was adopted after several robbers hiding in the forests near this barrio were caught whilst sleeping on straw mats (apli). They were then severely flogged and punished until they were left crawling (cadapa).
- Caggao – Named after a parasite called cagaw, which once infested the place.
- Luzong – This place was formerly three sitio: Pideng, Butak, and Dalimuno. Quicksand in the area caused the disappearance of working animals, hence the name "Luzong", derived from the Ilocano word lusong ("stuck").
- María Cristina – It is said that a visiting American once asked the village's name from a beautiful girl. Thinking that the stranger was asking for her name, the maiden answered "María Cristina".
- Mindoro – The name was derived from the Spanish Minas de Oro ("gold mine"). At that time there were gold dust and nuggets in the river beside the village, and people used to pan these and sell them to the rich. General Alzate gave the village its present name.
- Nagsabaran – This name (meaning "place where [the road] branches out") was given to the place because the national road branched out to this barrio. The root word is sabar, meaning "to branch out".
- Paratong – The old name was Libtong, which means "lagoon". During the Spanish Era, the prefix "lib" was changed into "para" which literally means "for".
- Quintarong – Once named Daya ti Sabangan ("east of the mouth of the river"), the place was a reputed hideout of native pirates called tirong whom villagers often saw running after one another (kinnamat in Ilocano).
- Reyna Regente – The village was named after a certain pre-Colonial queen who once ruled the area. Called Reyna Regente by later generations, it is said that she was ruthless. Her unnamed youngest daughter succeeded her, and unlike her mother was a wise and benevolent monarch.
- Rissing – The old name Pa-o was taken from a big tree in the area; when and how it became Rissing is unknown.
- San Blas – The place was named after a man who was reputedly known for his wisdom and was named after Saint Blaise.
- San Cristobal – Named after the town's patron saint, Saint Christopher.
- Sinapangan – Named after the sapang tree which grew abundantly in the place.
- Ubbog – The term ubbog means "spring". Long ago, water would well up through the earth even with little effort.

=== Climate ===
Climate data for Bangar, La Union
Month	Jan	Feb	Mar	Apr	May	Jun	Jul	Aug	Sep	Oct	Nov	Dec	Year
Mean daily maximum °C (°F)	30 (86)	31 (88)	33 (91)	34 (93)	32 (90)	31 (88)	30 (86)	30 (86)	30 (86)	31 (88)	31 (88)	31 (88)	31 (88)
Mean daily minimum °C (°F)	20 (68)	21 (70)	23 (73)	25 (77)	26 (79)	25 (77)	25 (77)	25 (77)	25 (77)	23 (73)	23 (73)	22 (72)	24 (74)
Average precipitation mm (inches)	27 (1.1)	31 (1.2)	40 (1.6)	71 (2.8)	207 (8.1)	237 (9.3)	286 (11.3)	261 (10.3)	261 (10.3)	254 (10.0)	88 (3.5)	46 (1.8)	1,809 (71.3)
Average rainy days	9.4	9.3	12.7	17.0	25.4	26.8	27.4	26.1	25.0	21.0	15.5	10.6	226.2
Source: Meteoblue

== Demographics ==
Population census of Bangar
Year	Pop.	±% p.a.
1903	9,851	—
1918	10,923	+0.69%
1939	12,484	+0.64%
1948	14,988	+2.05%
1960	16,381	+0.74%
1970	19,761	+1.89%
1975	20,752	+0.99%
1980	23,715	+2.70%
1990	25,966	+0.91%
1995	28,374	+1.68%
2000	31,491	+2.26%
2007	33,335	+0.79%
2010	34,522	+1.28%
2015	35,947	+0.77%
2020	38,041	+1.20%
2024	38,190	+0.09%
Source: Philippine Statistics Authority

=== Population ===
According to the 2020 census, the population of Bangar, La Union, was 38,041 people, with a density of 1,000 inhabitants per square kilometre or 2,600 inhabitants per square mile.

=== Language ===
Ilocano is the dominant dialect of Bangar.

=== Religion ===
==== Spanish-era curates of Bangar ====
- Rev Francisco de Alvear, OSA – 1696-1698
- Rev Manuel Miranda, OP – 1805-1809
- Rev Benito Tesauro, OSA – 1853-1864
- Rev Evaresto Guadalupe, OSA – 1866-1887

== Economy ==
Poverty incidence of Bangar

Source: Philippine Statistics Authority

== Government ==
=== Local government ===
Bangar is part of the first congressional district of the province of La Union. It is governed by a mayor designated as its local chief executive and by a municipal council as its legislative body in accordance with the Local Government Code. The mayor, vice mayor, and the councilors are elected directly by the people through an election which is being held every three years.

=== Elected officials ===
Members of the Municipal Council (2019–2022)
Position	Name
Congressman	Pablo C. Ortega
Mayor	Joy P. Merin
Vice-Mayor	Virgelio M. Dabalos
Councilors	Wilfredo R. Mosuela
Councilors	Michael M. Viray
Councilors	Rogelio F. Coloma
Councilors	Mario L. Makiling
Councilors	Emmanuel A. Mantilla
Councilors	Eduardo P. Flores
Councilors	Anthony J. Taguiam
Councilors	Anacleto L. Yukee

== Festivals ==
- The feast of the patron saint of Bangar, St. Christopher, is celebrated every July 25.
- The town fiesta of Bangar is celebrated every December 26 and 27.
- The Abel-Panday festival was first celebrated during the 2005 town fiesta. However, it was discontinued, only for it to be revived during the 2008 fiesta.

== Places of interest ==
- Saint Christopher Church – construction was started in 1696 by Fr. Francisco Alvear, a Spanish Augustinian priest born in Liaño, Santander, Spain who died in Bangar in 1698. It is the only church with three bell towers.
- Saint Christopher Convent – was built by Fr. Evaresto Guadalupe sometime between 1866 and 1887.
- Amburayan River – the setting of the Ilocano epic Biag ni Lam-ang, penned by the poet Pedro Bucaneg
- Imelda Cultural Stage – a project done by then President Ferdinand E. Marcos, through the sponsorship of his Minister of Tourism Jose D. Aspiras and constructed by Engr. Bernardo Vergara, then General Manager of the Philippine Tourism Authority
- Paratong Beach - located at the western part of the town. Locals experience the sunset view over the South China Sea while enjoying the food served by emerging local restaurants in the vicinity.

== Education ==
The Bangar Schools District Office governs all educational institutions within the municipality. It oversees the management and operations of all private and public elementary and high schools.

The town has 16 public elementary schools, two national high schools, a private school (offering complete pre-elementary, elementary, and high school education), one specialized high school, one technical-vocational school, and one tertiary school.

=== Primary and elementary schools ===
- Ag-Na Elementary School
- Bangaoilan Elementary School
- Bangar Central School
- Cadapli Elementary School
- Caggao Elementary School
- General Prim Elementary School
- Luzong Norte Elementary School
- Luzong Sur Elementary School
- Ma. Cristina Elementary School
- Paratong Elementary School
- Philippine Bethel Blessed Christian Academy
- Pudoc (Old Alzate) Elementary School
- Rissing Elementary School
- RUS Elementary School
- Saint Christopher Academy – the oldest school in Bangar, founded in 1945
- Sinapangan Elementary School
- Ter-Con Elementary School

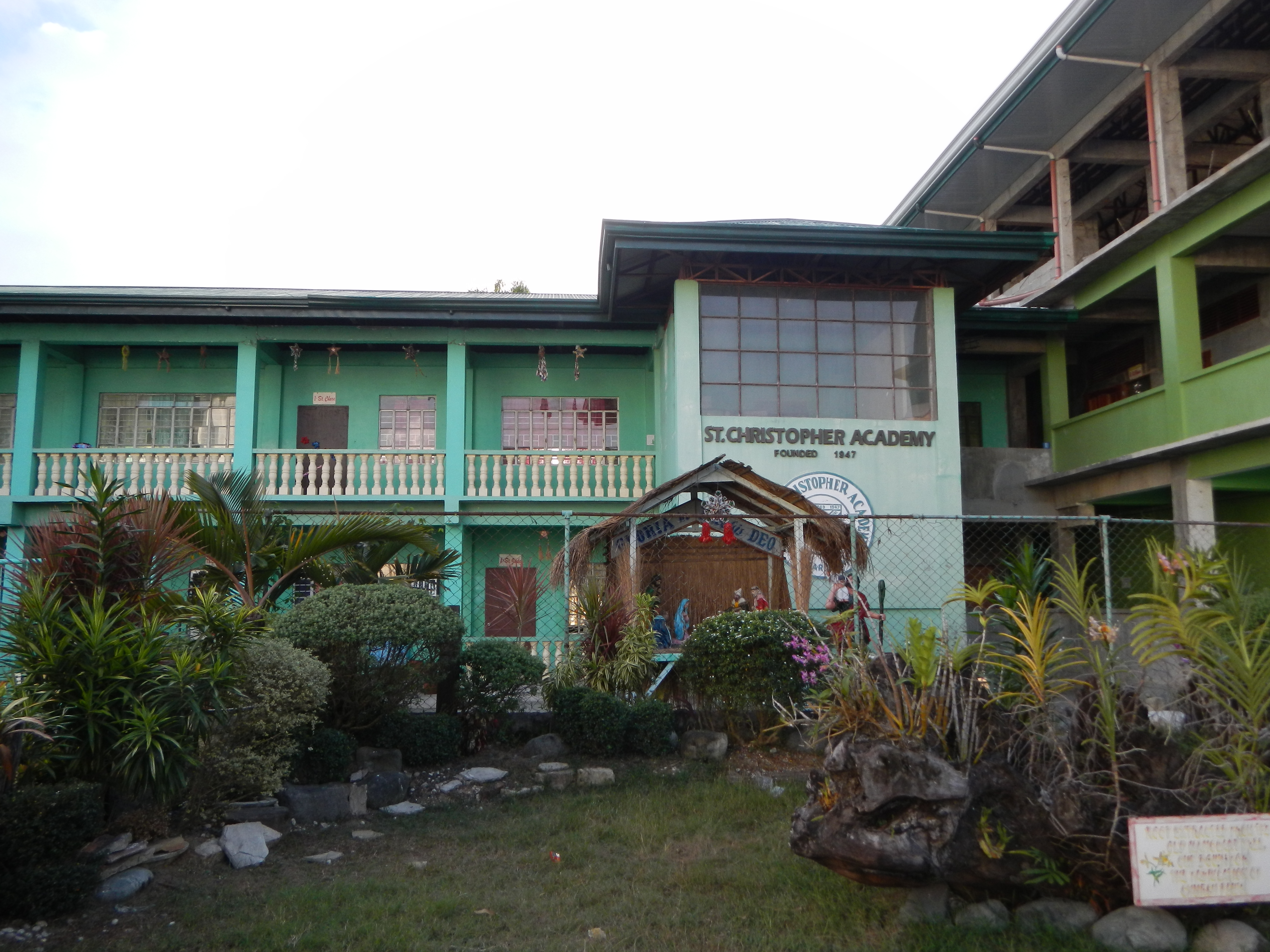
Saint Christopher Academy

=== Secondary schools ===
- St Christopher Academy
- Dona Francisca Lacsamana de Ortega Memorial National High School
- Casacristo National High School
- Luzong Sur Integrated School
- Mindoro Integrated School
- Paratong Integrated School
- Regional Science High School – a magnet school established during the school year 1994-1995 by virtue of DECS Order No. 69, s.1993. The school, with a curriculum that specializes in science and research (different from Special Science Program/ Engineering and Science Education Program schools), is operated and supervised by the Department of Education.

=== Technical and vocational school ===
- TSI Technical Institute – the only technical/vocational school in Bangar, located at Barangay Rissing.

=== Higher educational institution ===
- Saint Bernard College La Union – the only integrated school and Accredited TESDA training center in Bangar offering Basic Education, Secondary Education ( Senior High School Free tuition) & tertiary education.

== Notable personalities ==
- John Leo Dato – is a Filipino-American professional boxer born in Rissing, Bangar, La Union.

== Gallery ==
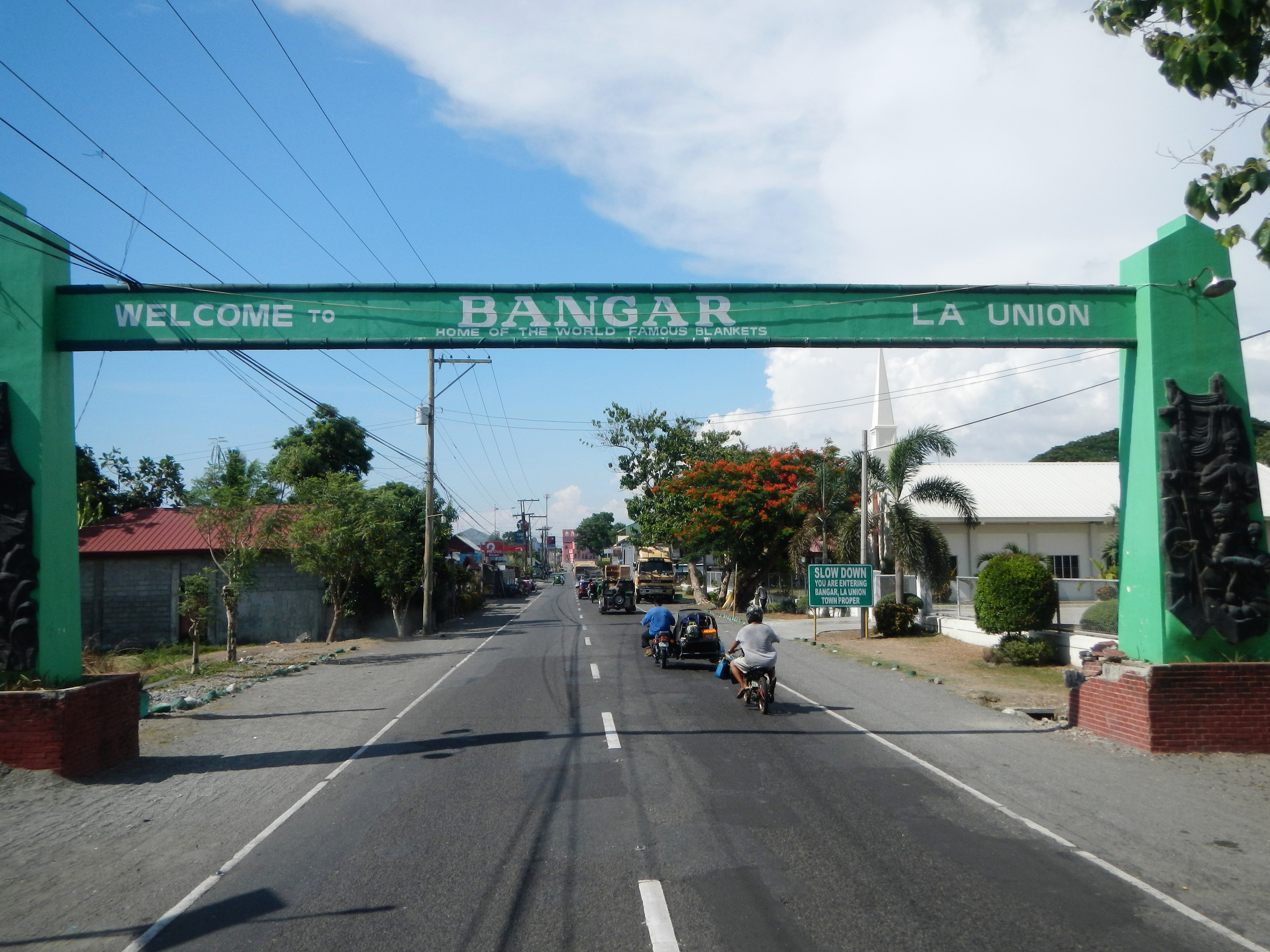
Welcome arch

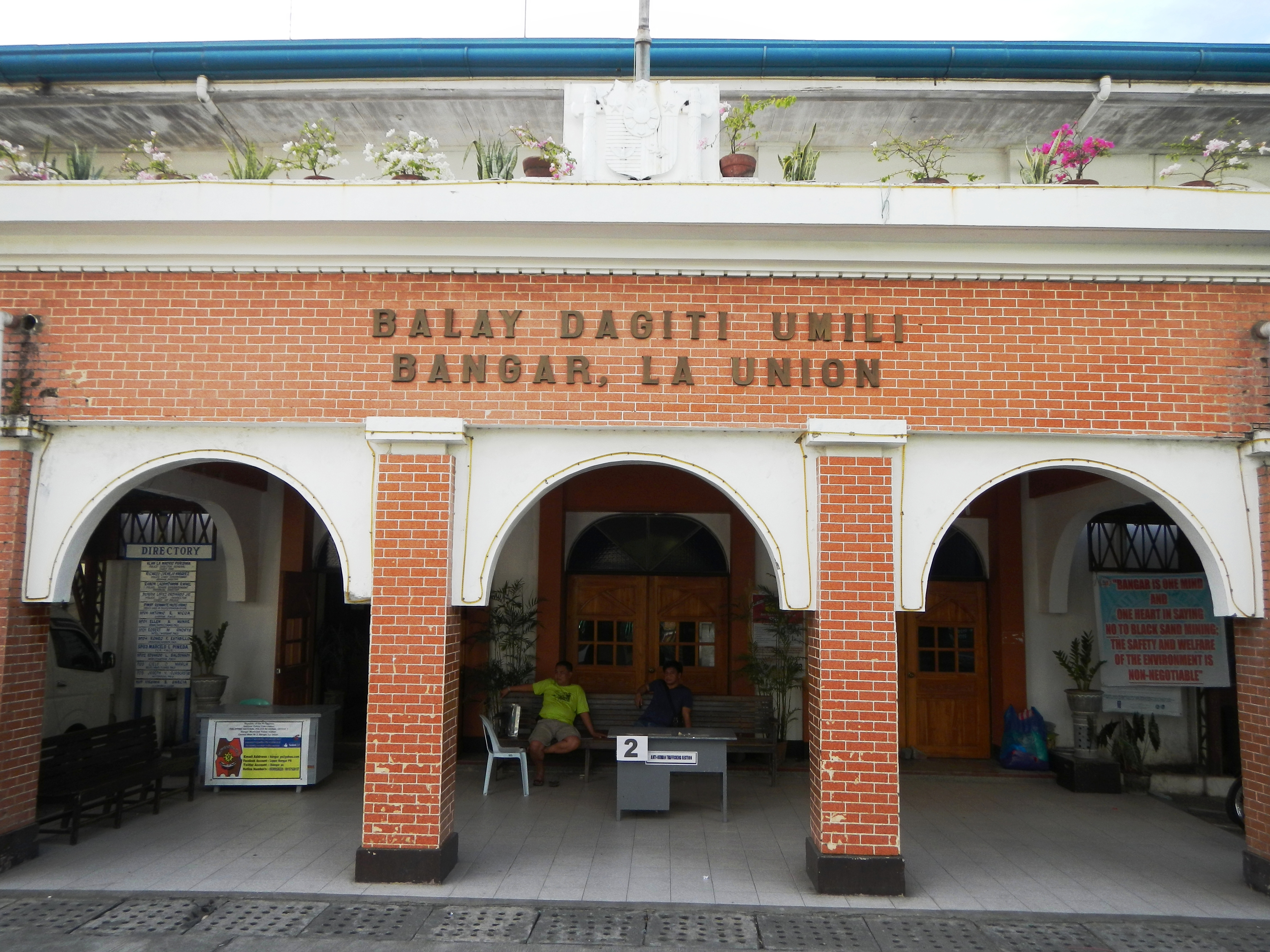
Municipal hall

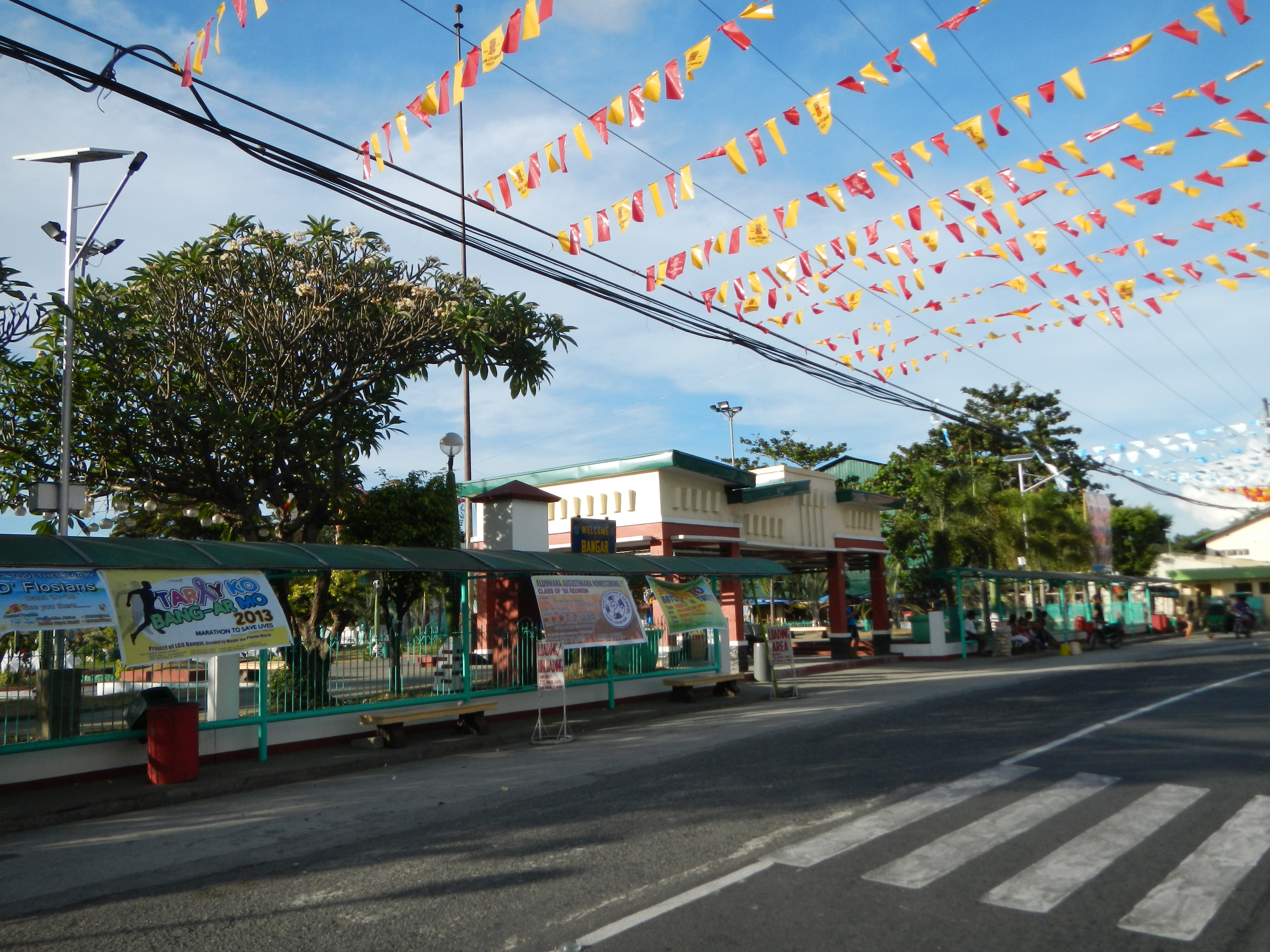
Town center

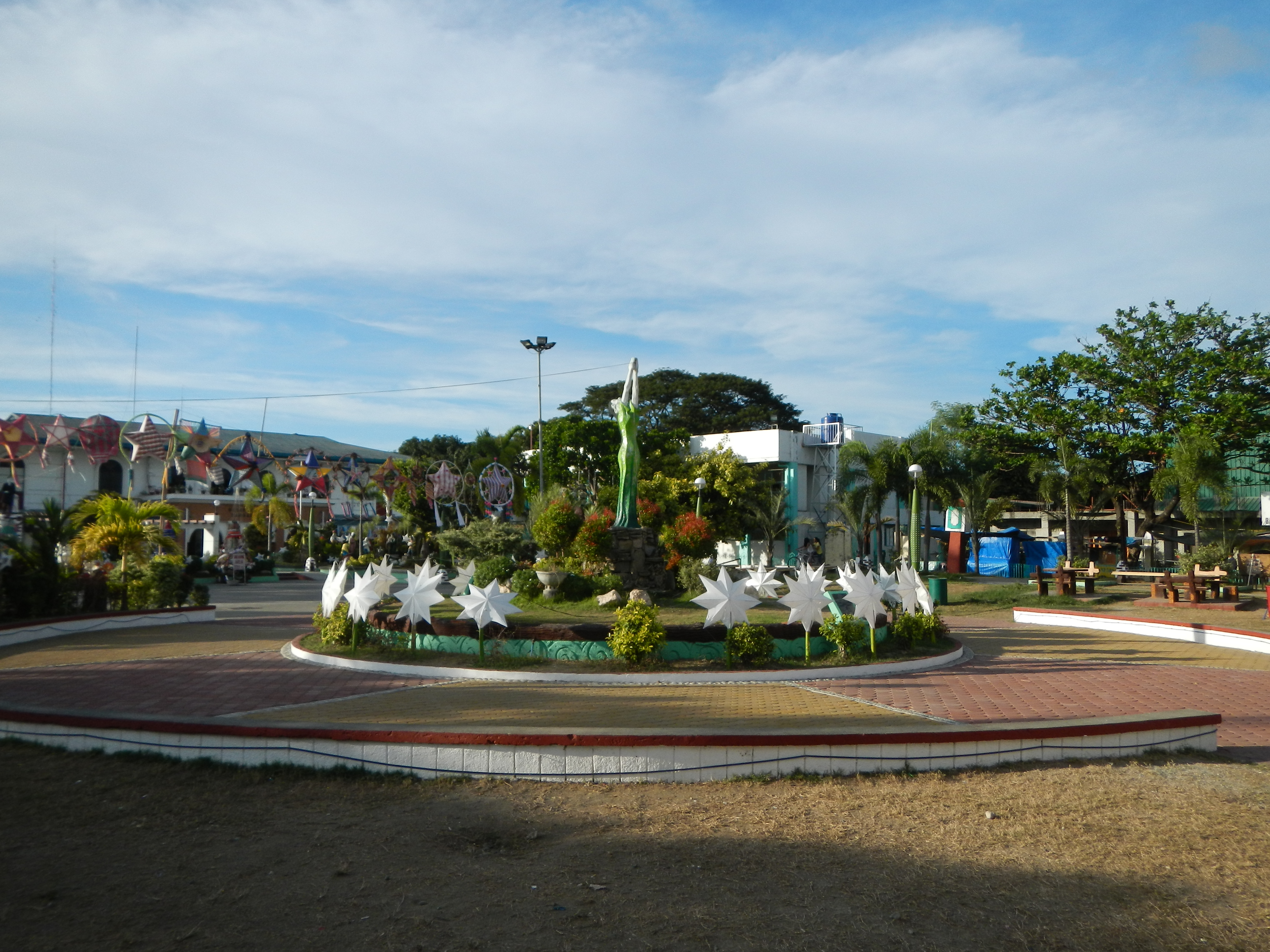
Town plaza

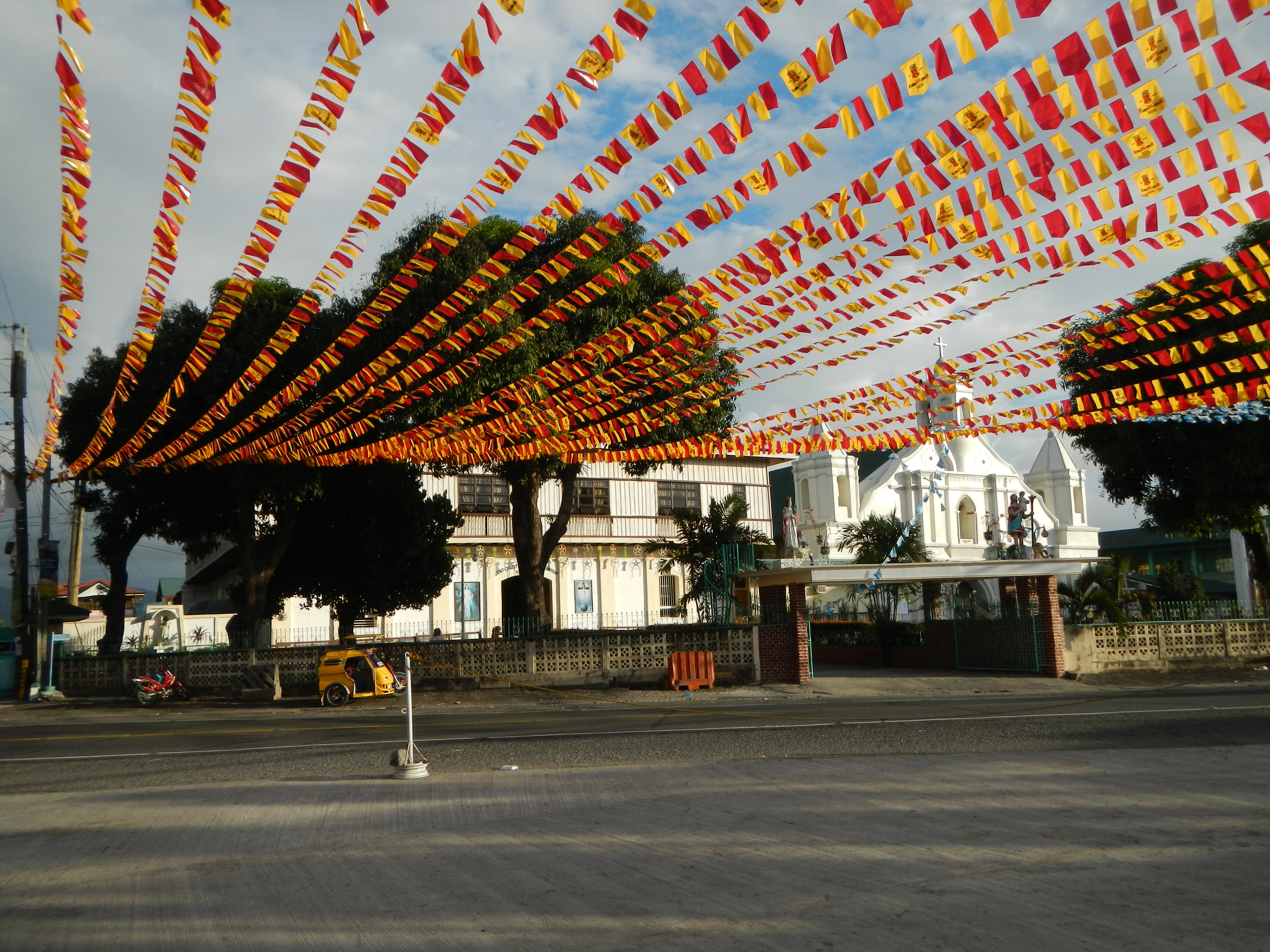
Saint Christopher Church
