= Tagudin =

Municipality in Ilocos Sur, Philippines

- Municipality
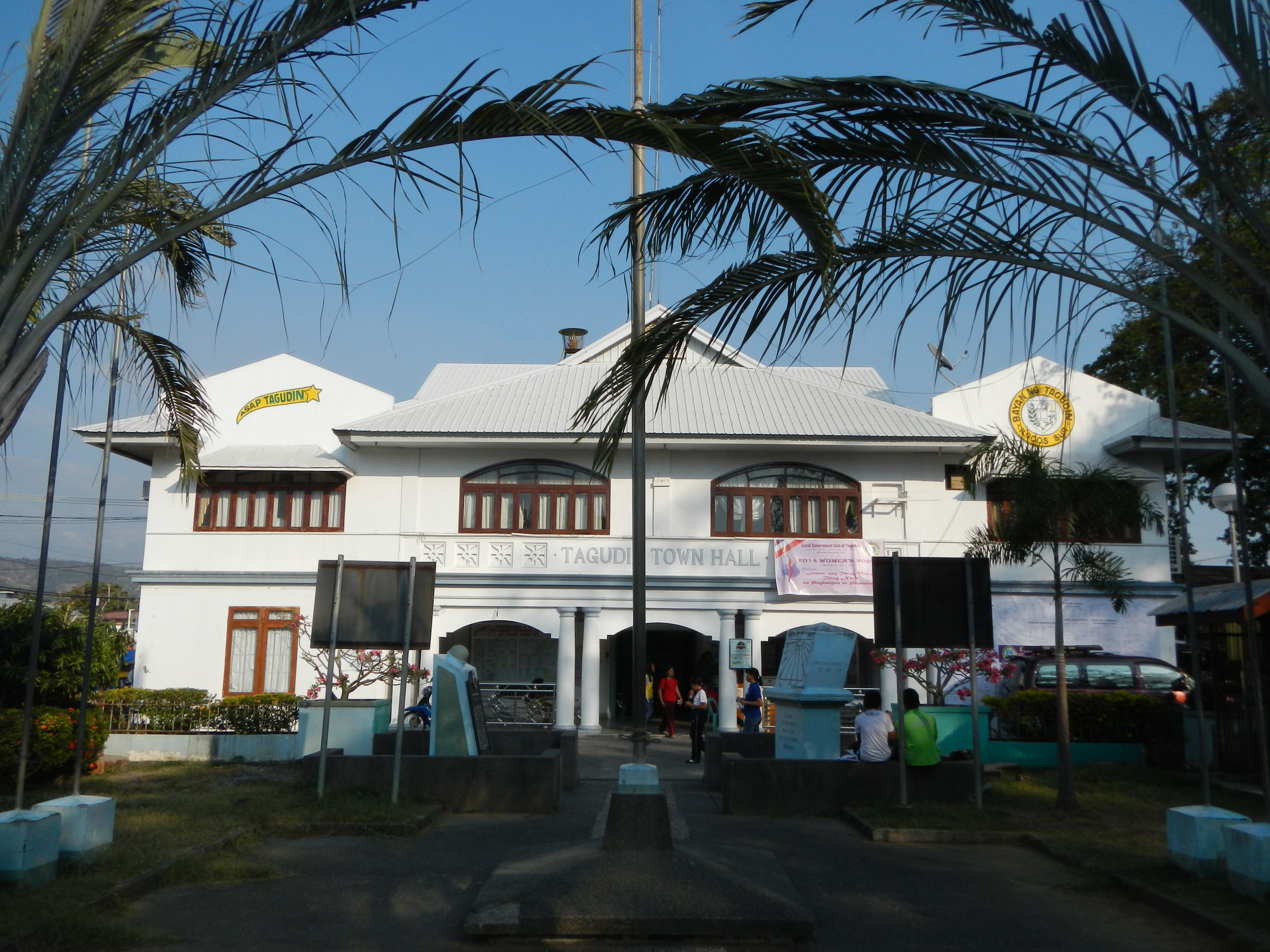
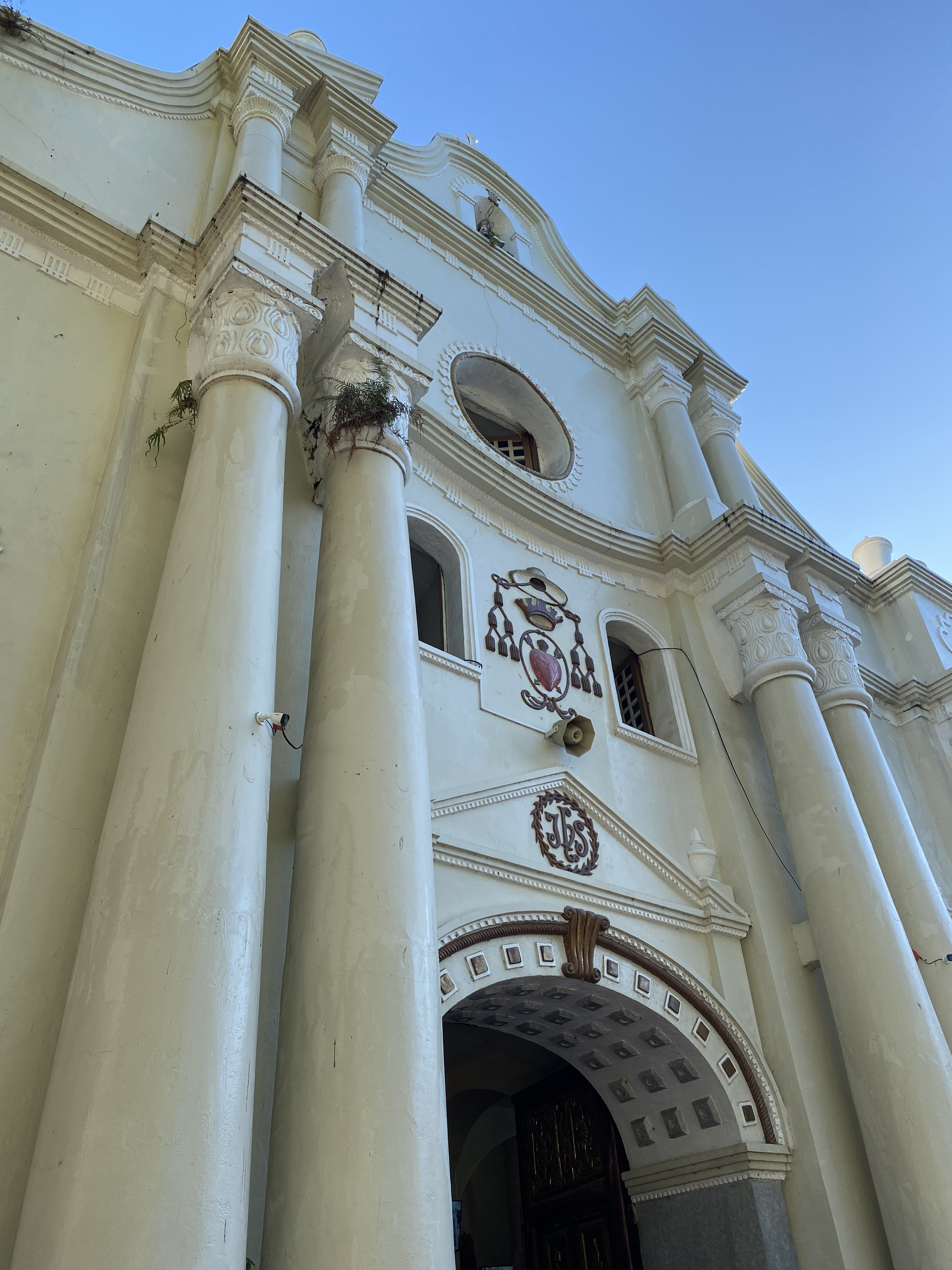
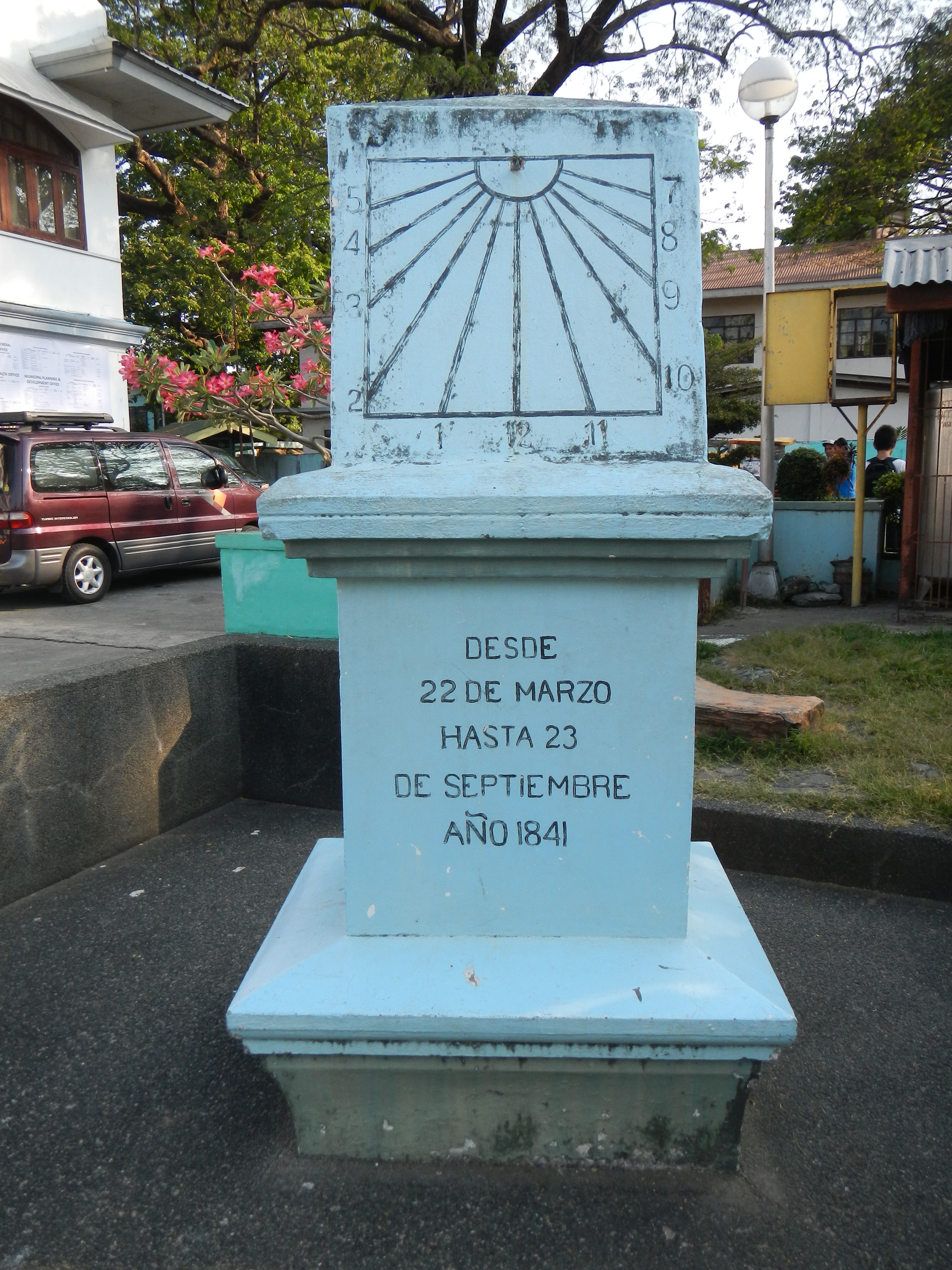
- Town Hall Church of the Conversion of St. Augustine 19th century sundial

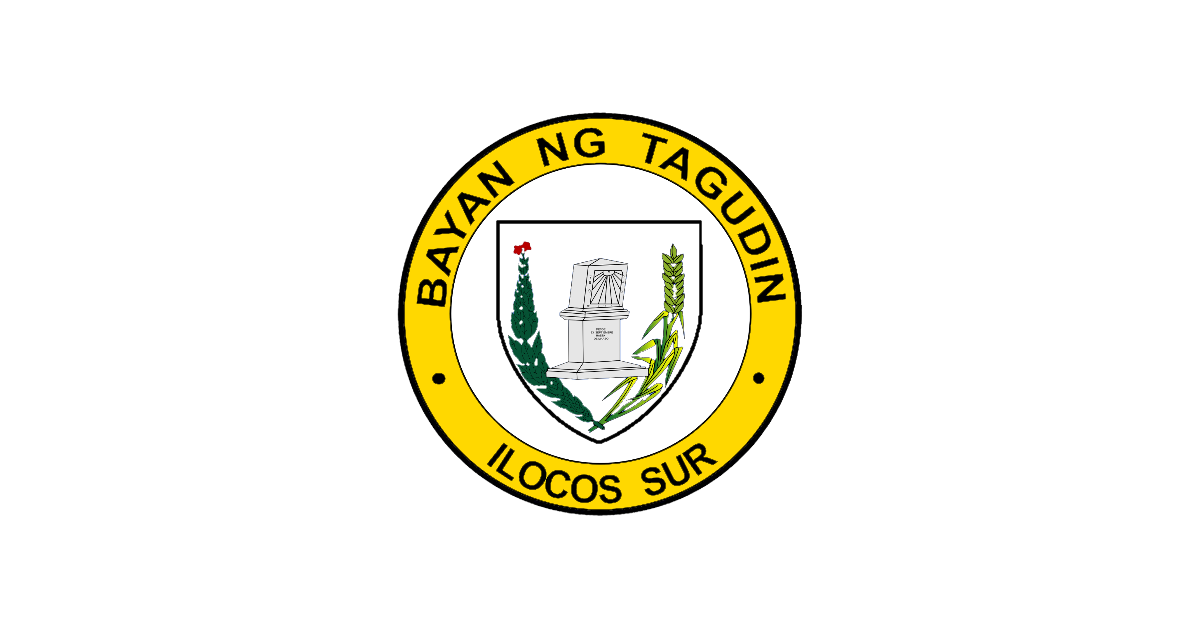
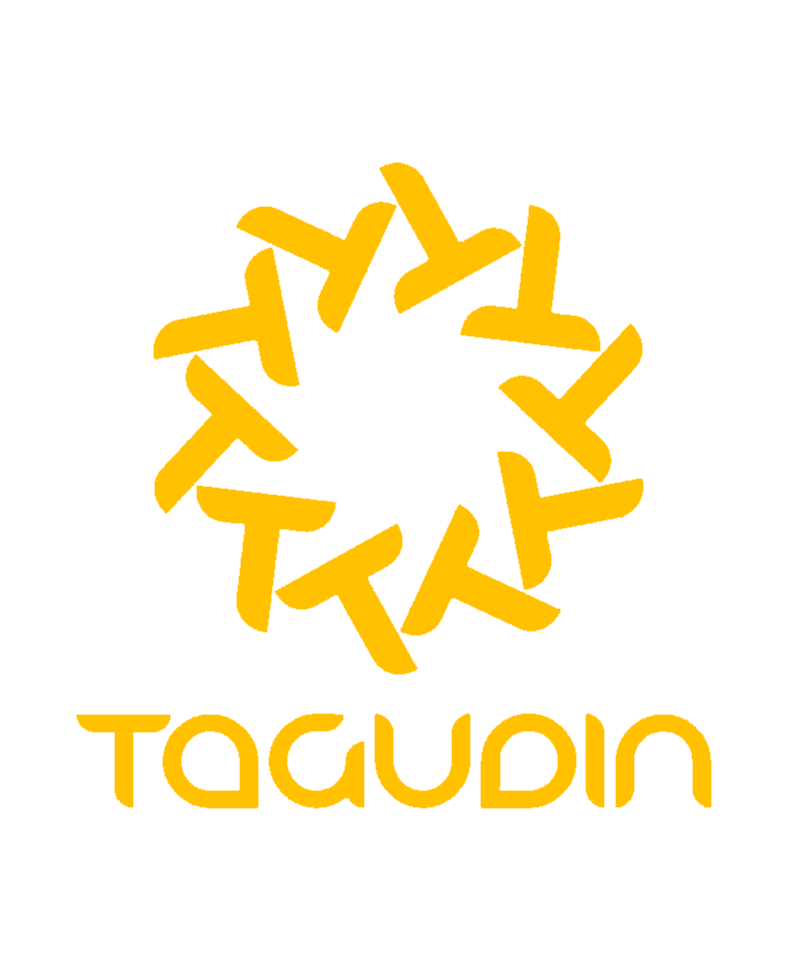
- Flag Seal Wordmark
- Motto: In God We Trust Tagudinians
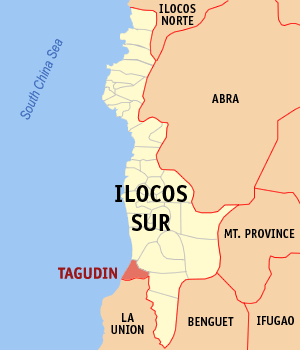
- Map of Ilocos Sur with Tagudin highlighted
- Interactive map of Tagudin
- Location within the Philippines
- Coordinates: 16°56′10″N 120°26′47″E
- Country: Philippines
- Region: Ilocos Region
- Province: Ilocos Sur
- District: 2nd district
- Barangays: 43 (see Barangays)

Government
  - Type: Sangguniang Bayan
  - Mayor: Evangeline Ingoy-Verzosa
  - Vice Mayor: Bernardo F. Tovera, Jr.
  - Representative: Kristine Singson-Meehan
  - Municipal Council: Members: Glayds L. Andaya; Fatima L. Pagaduan; Ofring Bayuga; Gilbert L. Lazo; Manuel Pedro Bunoan; Corazon L. Villanueva; Ma. Theresa Vullanueva; Percival PJ Mina Jr.
  - Electorate: 29,437 voters (2025)

Area
  - Total: 151.19 km^{2} (58.37 sq mi)
- Elevation: 30 m (98 ft)
- Highest elevation: 351 m (1,152 ft)
- Lowest elevation: 0 m (0 ft)

Population (2024 census)
  - Total: 41,606
  - Density: 275.19/km^{2} (712.74/sq mi)
  - Households: 9,992

Economy
  - Income class: 1st municipal income class
  - Poverty incidence: 5.88% (2023)
  - Revenue: ₱ 469.6 million (2024)
  - Assets: ₱ 1,364 million (2024)
  - Expenditure: ₱ 314.8 million (2024)
  - Liabilities: ₱ 96.46 million (2024)

Service provider
  - Electricity: Ilocos Sur Electric Cooperative (ISECO)
- Time zone: UTC+8 (PST)
- ZIP code: 2714
- PSGC: 0102933000
- IDD : area code: +63 (0)77
- Native languages: Ilocano; Tagalog
- Website: tagudin.gov.ph

Tagudin, officially the Municipality of Tagudin (Ilocano: Ili ti Tagudin; Tagalog: Bayan ng Tagudin; Spanish: Municipio de Tagudín), is a municipality in the province of Ilocos Sur, Philippines. According to the 2024 census, it has a population of 41,606 people.

== Etymology ==
The name of the municipality was derived from a native cotton drying rack called "tagudan." A Spaniard who came to the place asked for its name, wrote it as the settlement when told by a resident, who thought that he was asking the name of the traditional apparatus she was using.

== History ==
According to William Henry Scott, "Chinese and Japanese ships bartered gold in Tagudin in Juan de Salcedo's day."

Records of Saint Augustine's Parish record that Spanish Conquistadors headed by Juan de Salcedo, together with the Augustinian missionaries, started to move northward from Manila in 1571. On 5 January 1586 they founded the first towns of Laoag, Bulatao, Kaog and Tagudin.

In 1818, Tagudin became a part of Ilocos Sur and thus the southern gateway to the province. The first two sundials were constructed in Tagudin in 1841 and 1845, respectively, by Father Juan Sorolla.

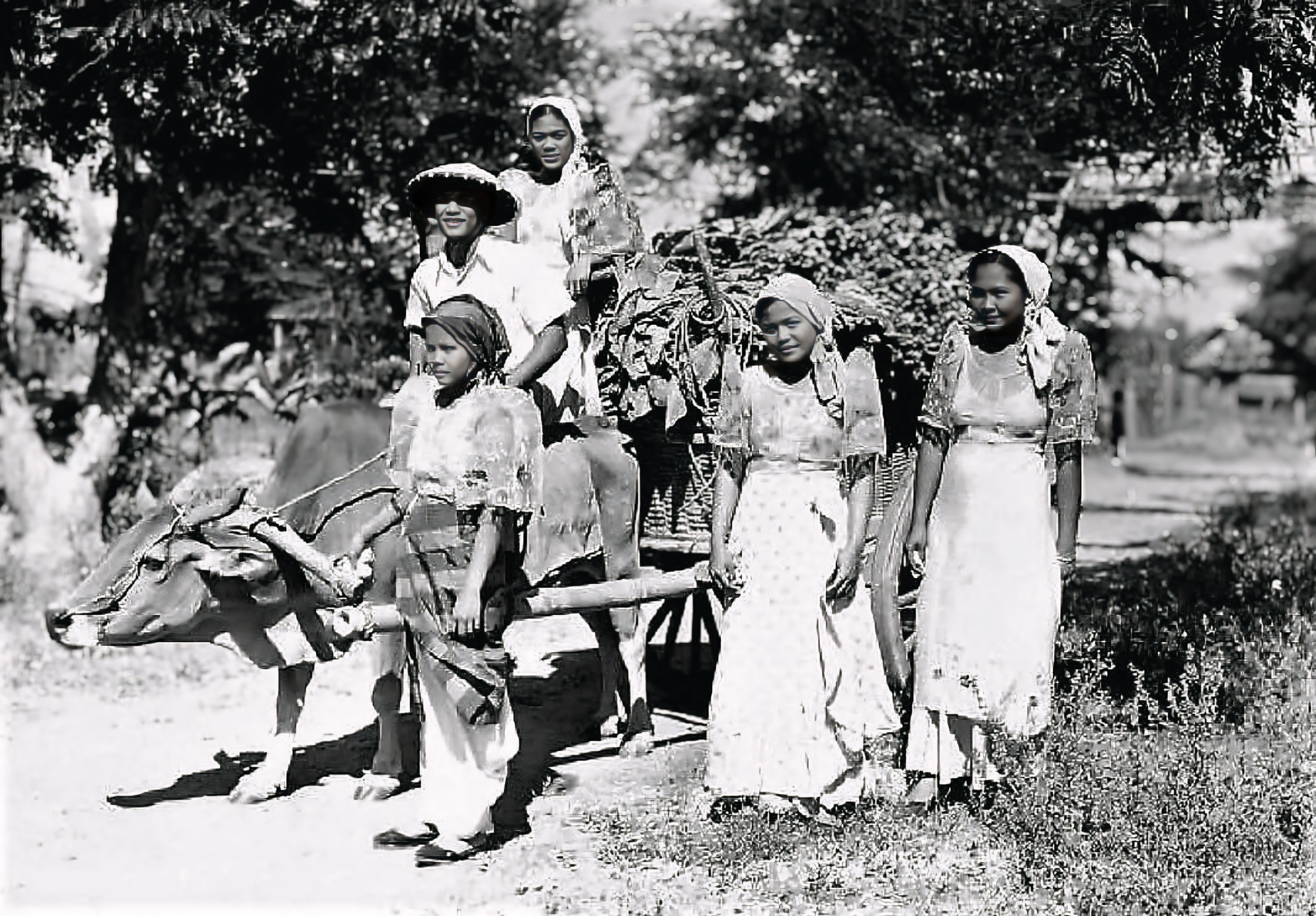
Ilocano Family from Tagudin, ca. 1920s

On 18 August 1908, Tagudin replaced Alilem as the capital of the sub-province of Amburayan, which included Lepanto (that became a sub-province now included in the province of Benguet), Angkaki (now Quirino), Suyo, and Alilem (now with Ilocos Sur), and Sudipen, Santol, and San Gabriel (formerly with Ilocos Sur but became part of La Union).

Tagudin was made the site of the Base Hospital of the United States Armed Forces in the Philippines-Northern Luzon (USAFIP-NL) in 1945 during World War II. It was also the site of the military general headquarters of the USAFIP-NL 121st Infantry Regiments under the Philippine Commonwealth Army. The decisive Battle of Bessang Pass started in this municipality, at Bitalag.

== Geography ==
The Municipality of Tagudin is bordered to the north by the municipality of Santa Cruz to the north, Suyo and Alilem to the east, and the province of La Union to the south by Bangar and Sudipen, La Union. The town is accessible via MacArthur Highway and Bessang Pass.

Tagudin is situated 91.45 kilometres (56.82 mi) from the provincial capital Vigan, and 313.01 kilometres (194.50 mi) from the country's capital city of Manila.

=== Barangays ===
Tagudin is politically subdivided into 43 barangays. Each barangay consists of puroks and some have sitios.

- Ag-aguman
- Ambalayat
- Baracbac
- Bario-an
- Baritao
- Becques
- Bimmanga
- Bio
- Bitalag
- Borono
- Bucao East
- Bucao West
- Cabaroan
- Cabugbugan
- Cabulanglangan
- Dacutan
- Dardarat
- Del Pilar
- Farola
- Gabur
- Garitan
- Jardin
- Lacong
- Lantag
- Las-ud
- Libtong
- Lubnac
- Magsaysay
- Malacañang
- Pacac
- Pallogan
- Pudoc East
- Pudoc West
- Pula
- Quirino
- Ranget
- Rizal
- Salvacion
- San Miguel
- Sawat
- Tallaoen
- Tampugo
- Tarangotong

=== Climate ===
Climate data for Tagudin, Ilocos Sur
Month	Jan	Feb	Mar	Apr	May	Jun	Jul	Aug	Sep	Oct	Nov	Dec	Year
Mean daily maximum °C (°F)	30 (86)	31 (88)	33 (91)	34 (93)	32 (90)	31 (88)	30 (86)	30 (86)	30 (86)	31 (88)	31 (88)	31 (88)	31 (88)
Mean daily minimum °C (°F)	20 (68)	21 (70)	23 (73)	25 (77)	26 (79)	26 (79)	25 (77)	25 (77)	25 (77)	23 (73)	22 (72)	21 (70)	24 (74)
Average precipitation mm (inches)	27 (1.1)	31 (1.2)	40 (1.6)	71 (2.8)	207 (8.1)	237 (9.3)	286 (11.3)	261 (10.3)	261 (10.3)	254 (10.0)	88 (3.5)	46 (1.8)	1,809 (71.3)
Average rainy days	9.4	9.3	12.7	17.0	25.4	26.8	27.4	26.1	25.0	21.0	15.5	10.6	226.2
Source: Meteoblue (modeled/calculated data, not measured locally)

== Demographics ==
Population census of Tagudin

Year	Pop.	±% p.a.
1903	8,503	—
1918	11,237	+1.88%
1939	13,115	+0.74%
1948	15,637	+1.97%
1960	18,191	+1.27%
1970	19,575	+0.74%

Year	Pop.	±% p.a.
1975	22,887	+3.18%
1980	23,432	+0.47%
1990	29,295	+2.26%
1995	30,697	+0.88%
2000	34,427	+2.49%
2007	35,791	+0.54%

Year	Pop.	±% p.a.
2010	38,122	+2.32%
2015	39,277	+0.57%
2020	41,538	+1.18%
2024	41,606	+0.04%

Source: Philippine Statistics Authority

In the 2024 census, Tagudin had a population of 41,606 people. The population density was 280 inhabitants per square kilometre (730/sq mi).

=== Language ===
Ilocano is the predominant dialect of Tagudin.

== Economy ==
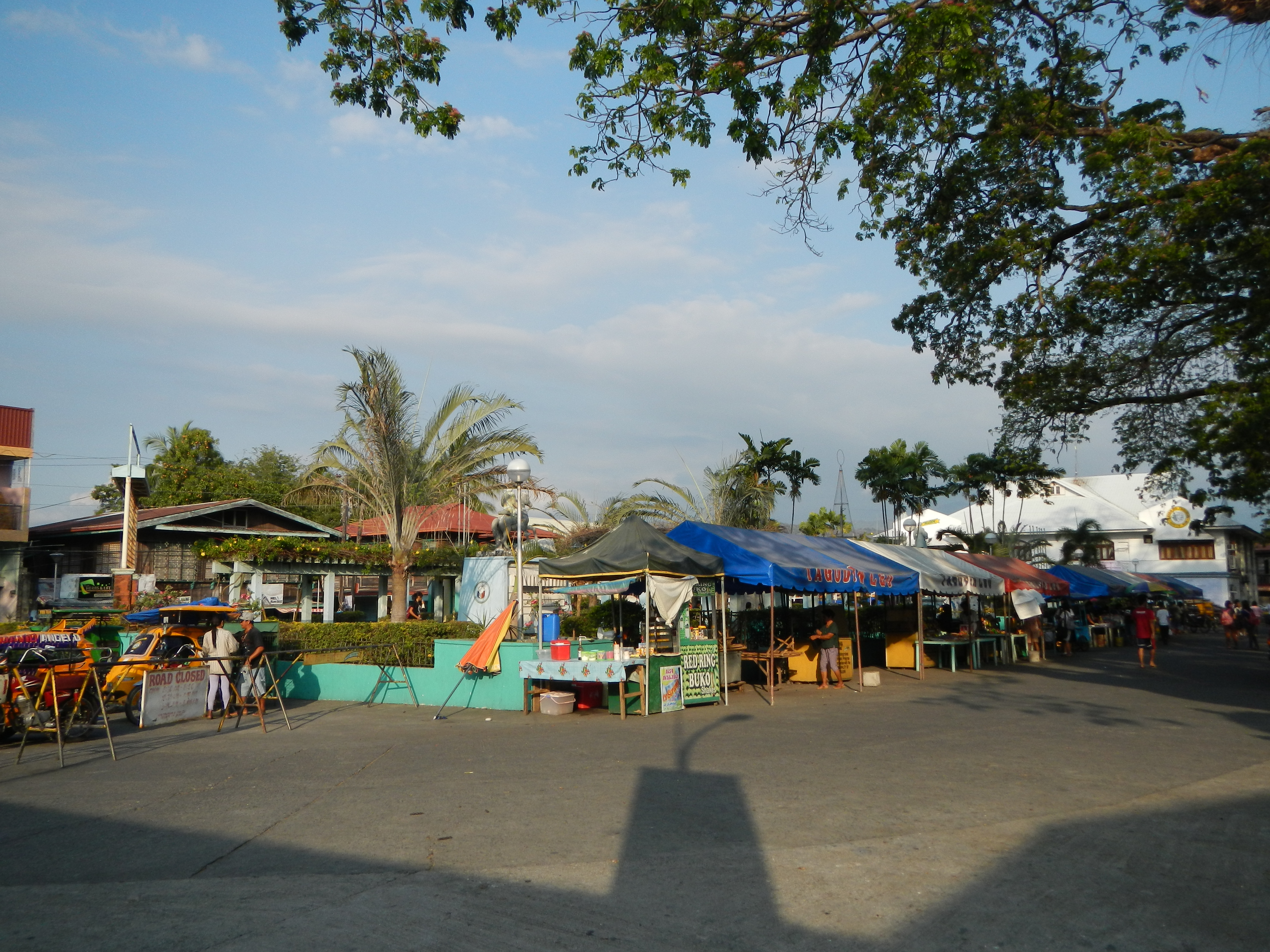
Central plaza of Tagudin

Poverty incidence of Tagudin (%)

Source: Philippine Statistics Authority

== Government ==
=== Local government ===
Tagudin, belonging to the second congressional district of the province of Ilocos Sur, is governed by a mayor designated as its local chief executive and by a municipal council as its legislative body in accordance with the Local Government Code. The mayor, vice mayor, and the councilors are elected directly by the people through an election which is being held every three years.

=== Elected officials ===
Members of the Municipal Council (2025–2028)
Position	Name
Congressman	Kristine Singson-Meehan
Mayor	Evangeline Ingoy-Verzosa
Vice-Mayor	Bernardo F. Tovera Jr.
Councilors	Gladys L. Andaya
Councilors	Fatima L. Pagaduan
Councilors	Onofre Emerito L. Bayuga
Councilors	Gilbert L. Lazo
Councilors	Mauel Pedro Q. Bunoan
Councilors	Corazon L. Villanueva
Councilors	Ma. Theresa N. Villanueva
Councilors	Percival PJ Mina Jr.
ABC President	Eugene L. Fernandez

== Education ==
The Tagudin Schools District Office governs the operations of all private and public elementary and high school throughout the municipality.

=== Primary and elementary schools ===
- Ambalayat Integrated School (Elementary)
- Adventist School Tagudin Campus
- Ag-aguman Elementary School
- Baracbac Community School
- Becques Community School
- Bimmanga Community School
- Bio Elementary School
- Bitalag Elementary School
- Cabugbugan Comm. Sch.
- Cabulanglangan Elementary School
- Christ Servant Academy (Elementary)
- Family Christian Center
- Garitan Integrated School
- Las-ud Elementary School
- Libtong Integrated School (Elementary)
- Maranatha Christian Academy
- Pacac Elementary School
- Pallogan Elementary School
- Pudoc East Elementary School
- San Miguel Elementary School
- San Pedro Community School
- Tagudin Central School
- Tallaoen Elementary School
- Tampugo Elementary School
- UCCP Christ-Gifted Academy

Saint Augustine's School

=== Secondary schools ===
- Ambalayat Integrated School
- Asean Institute for Research and Technology
- Christ Servant Academy
- Garitan Integrated School
- Ilocos Sur Polytechnic State College (High School)
- Libtong Integrated School
- Pudoc West Integrated School
- Saint Augustine's School
- Tagudin National High School
