= Balaoan Church =

Roman Catholic church in La Union, Philippines

- Saint Nicholas of Tolentino Parish Church; San Nicolas de Tolentino Parish Church
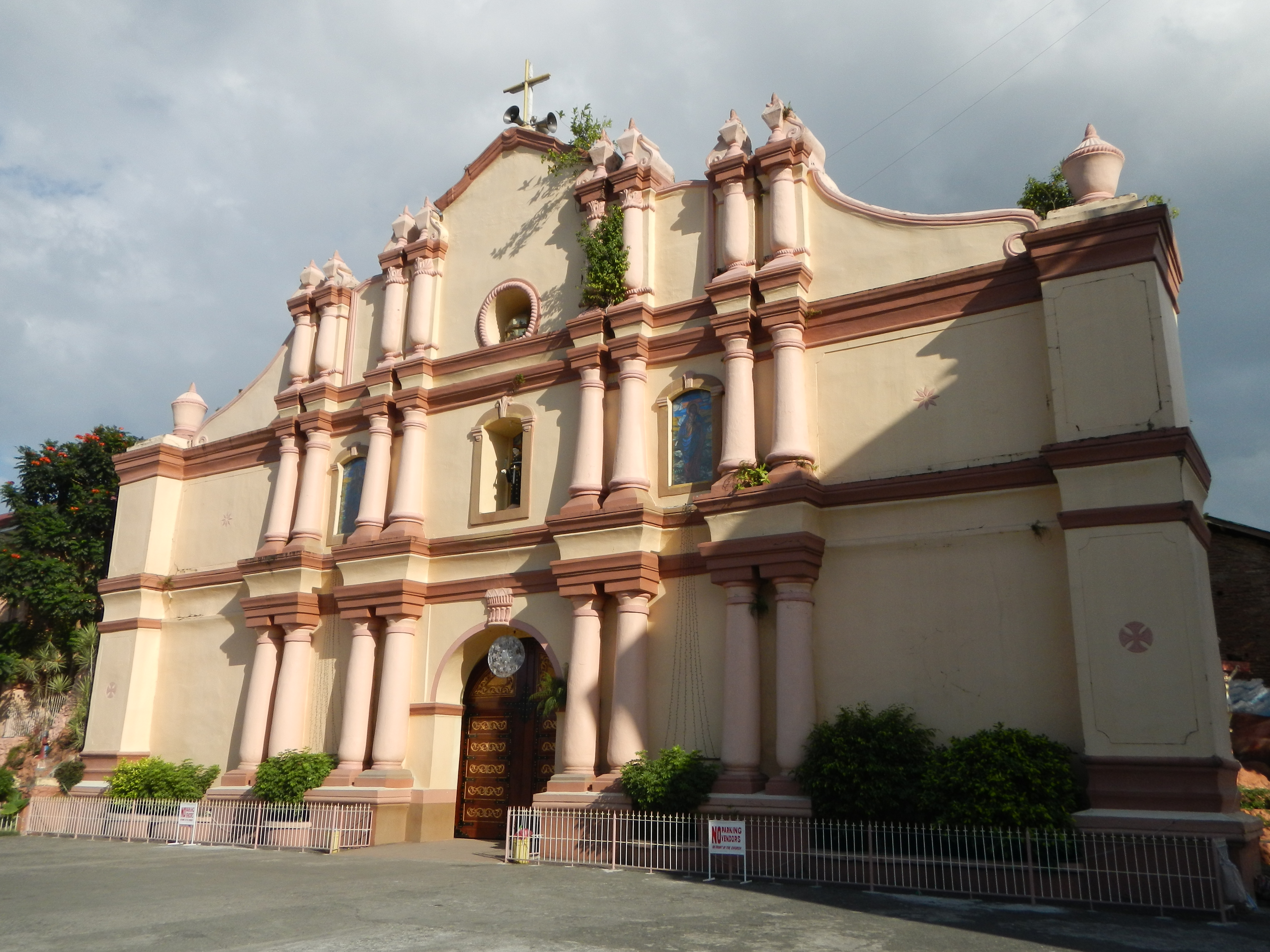
- Church facade in 2013

- Location in Luzon Location in the Philippines
- 16°49′16″N 120°24′12″E
- Location: Poblacion, Balaoan, La Union
- Country: Philippines
- Denomination: Roman Catholic

History
- Status: Parish church
- Dedication: Saint Nicholas of Tolentino

Architecture
- Functional status: Active
- Architectural type: Church building
- Style: Baroque
- Groundbreaking: 1820s
- Completed: 1864

Administration
- Archdiocese: Lingayen-Dagupan
- Diocese: San Fernando de La Union

Clergy
- Archbishop: Socrates B. Villegas
- Bishop: Daniel O. Presto

Saint Nicholas of Tolentino Parish Church, commonly known as Balaoan Church, is a Roman Catholic church located in Balaoan, La Union, Philippines under the jurisdiction of the Diocese of San Fernando de La Union. It used to be called Purao, and is under the advocacy San Nicolas de Tolentino.

== Church history ==
Balaoan used to be known as Purao. It was organized as a town from different rancherias in 1586. On June 29, 1587, Father Juan Bautista de Montoya was appointed as prior of Purao with the Augustinians accepting the convent to their order. Other references claim Father Juan Bautista de Sandoval as the first priest before Montoya while some other sources say Father Diego de Rojas. In 1597, the convent of Purao was allowed to vote in provincial meetings on the Augustinians. In 1603, Purao was annexed to Tagudin. People went back to the rancherias and the population decreased. Purao was made a visita in 1734. It was annexed to Namacpacan in 1739 and the name of the town of Purao was changed to what is known today as Balaoan.

The church was constructed around the 1820s. It was half-complete in 1829 with its sacristy and main chapel done. Father Juan Antonio Fernandez continued the construction by extending the church from the presbytery to the main entrance from his appointment to Balaoan in 1769 until his death in 1829. Father Valentin Noval continued the work on the church when he was appointed in 1839. When Father Noval died in 1864, the church was finally finished. In 1877, a convent and cemetery was built under the supervision of Father Casimiro Melgosa. The church was slightly damaged by an earthquake in 1880. Father Isidro Saez repaired the church in 1891. Although the church underwent major renovations, it has retained its original foundation and designs.

== Features ==
The church falls under the Baroque architecture. It is made of lime, bricks, and stone. Across the three-story facade is four pairs of columns and lantern-like finials with two acroterium on top of angular piers on the column's end. Its pediment ends up in a small scroll. A separate bell tower is found adjacent to the church. On the ceiling of the main altar is the murals of the Four Evangelists. On the right side of the main altar is the altar for the Our Lady of Namacpacan and on the left side is the altar for Saint Nicholas of Tolentino.

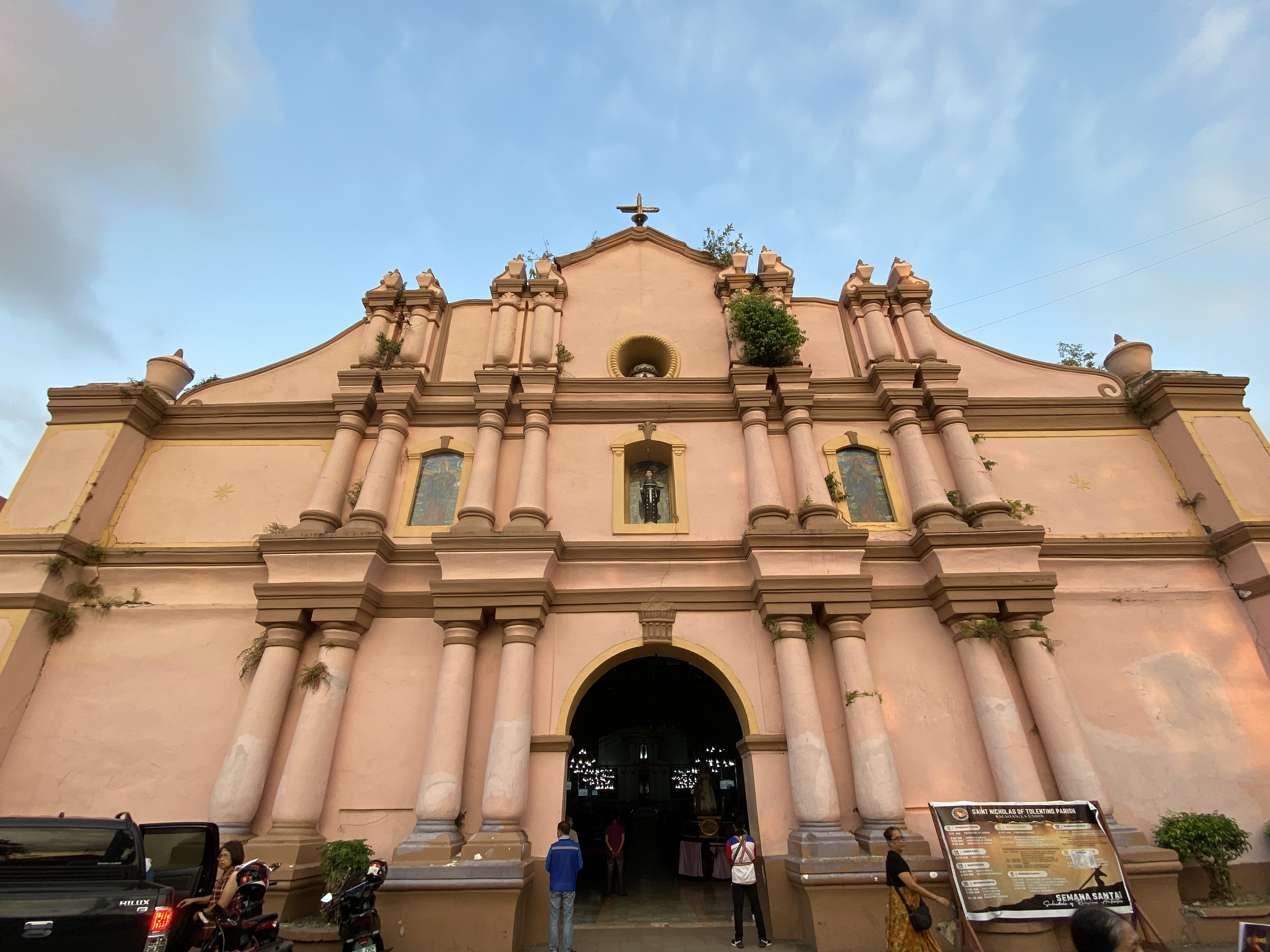
Façade in 2025

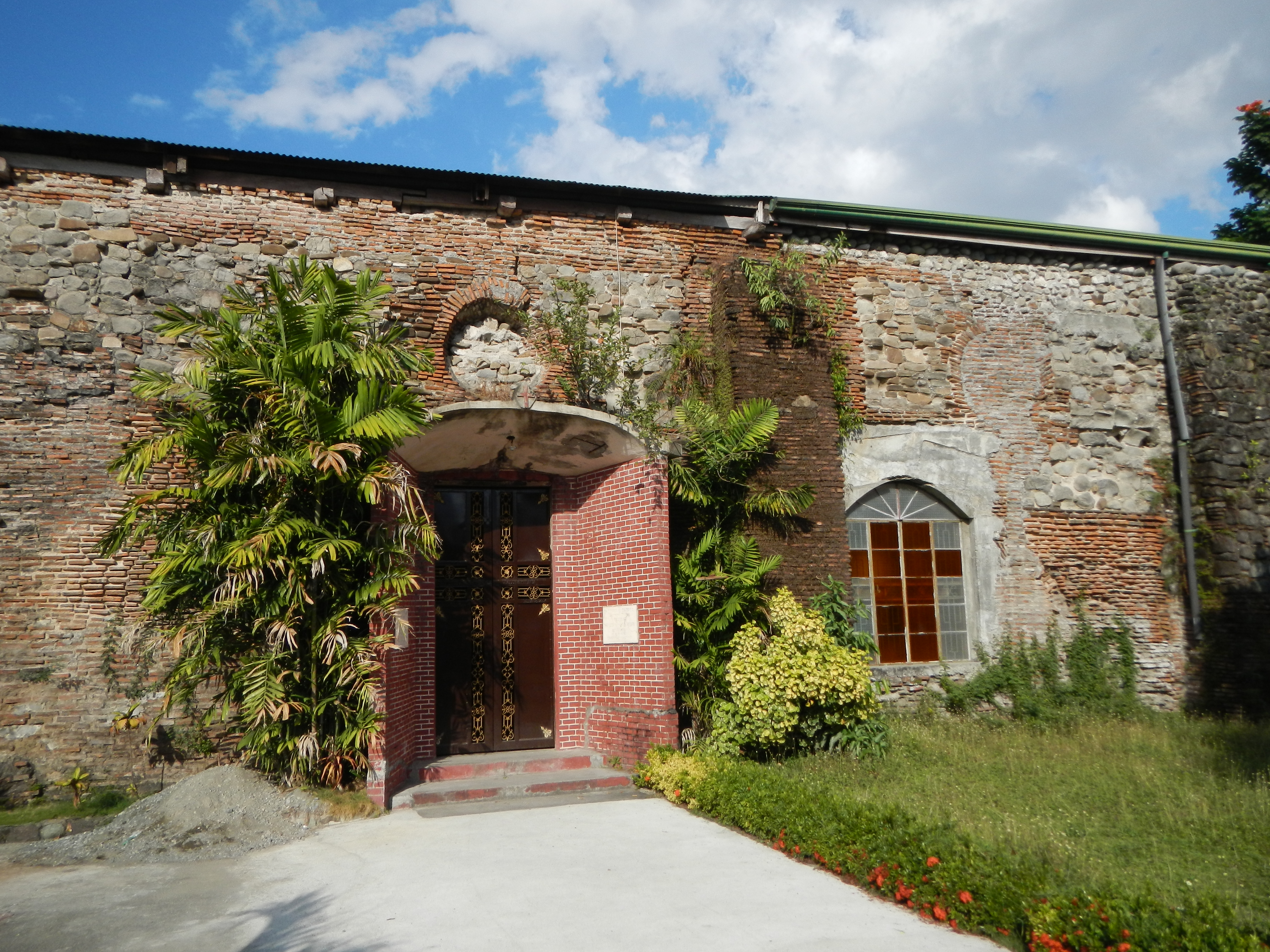
Church walls

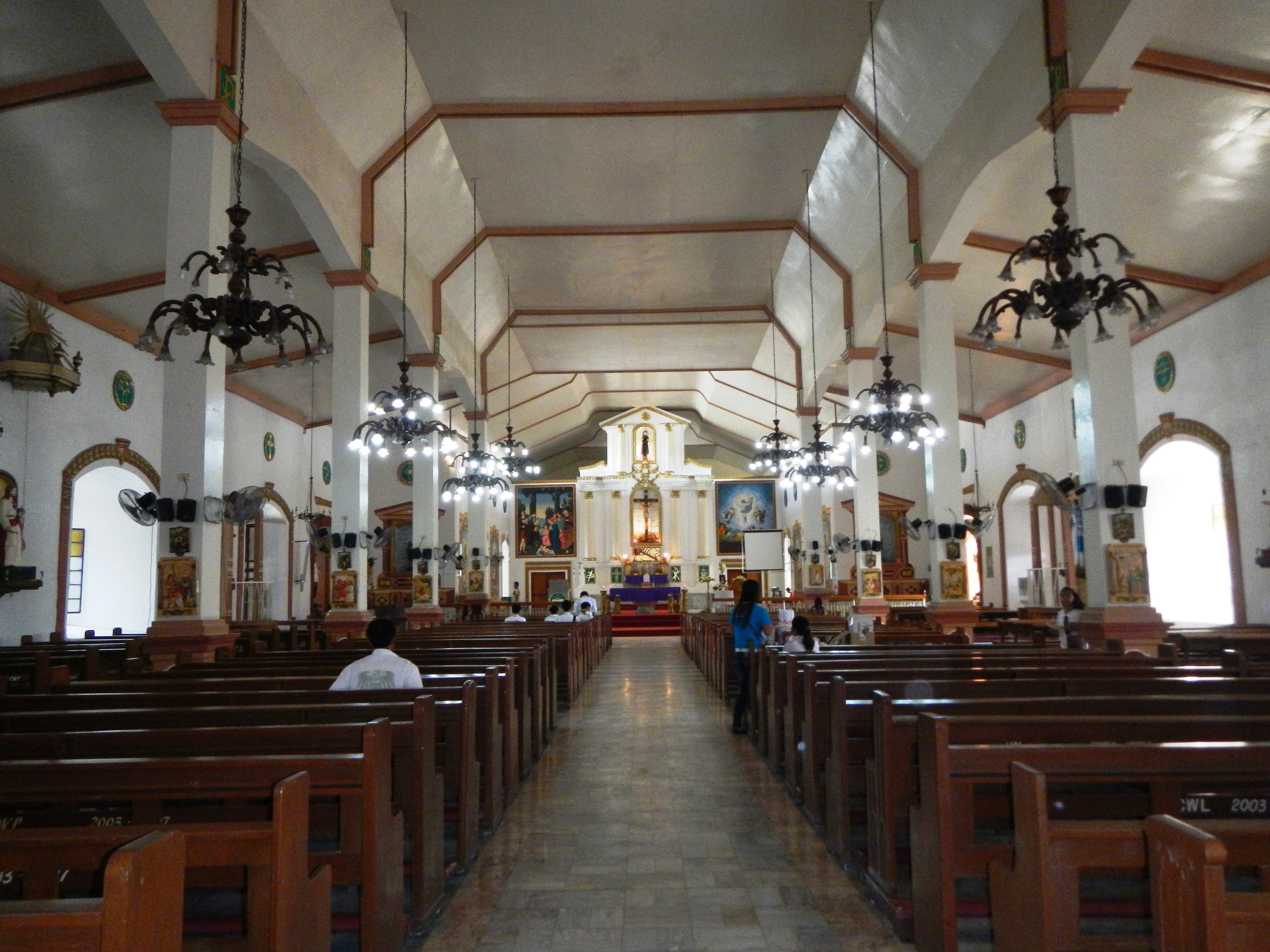
Nave in 2014

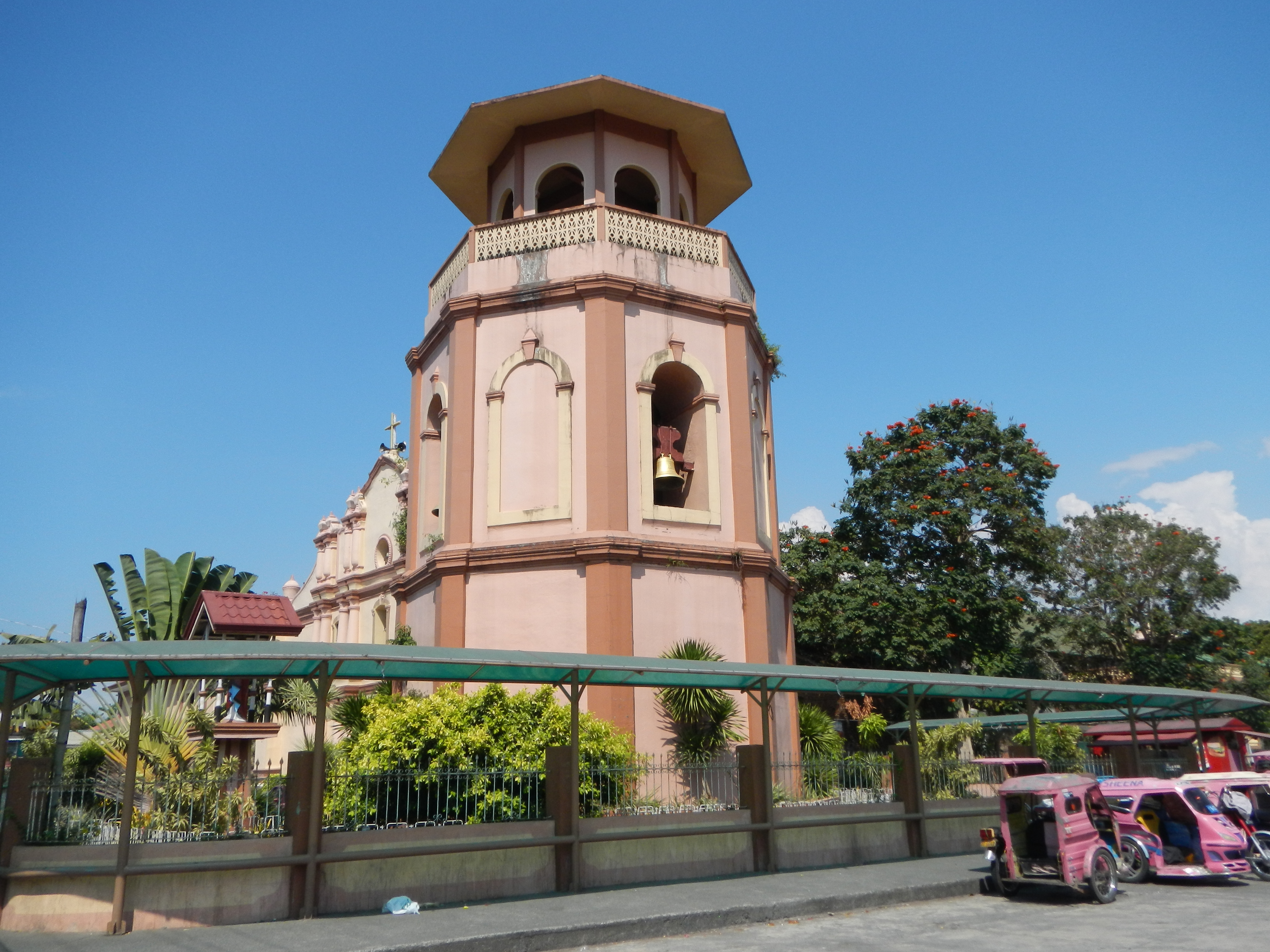
Bell tower in 2014

== Bibliography ==
- Dela Torre, Visitacion (2006). The Ilocos Heritage. Makati City: Tower Book House. ISBN 978-971-91030-9-7.
