= Luna, La Union =

Municipality in La Union, Philippines

Luna Namacpacan
- Municipality
- Municipality of Luna
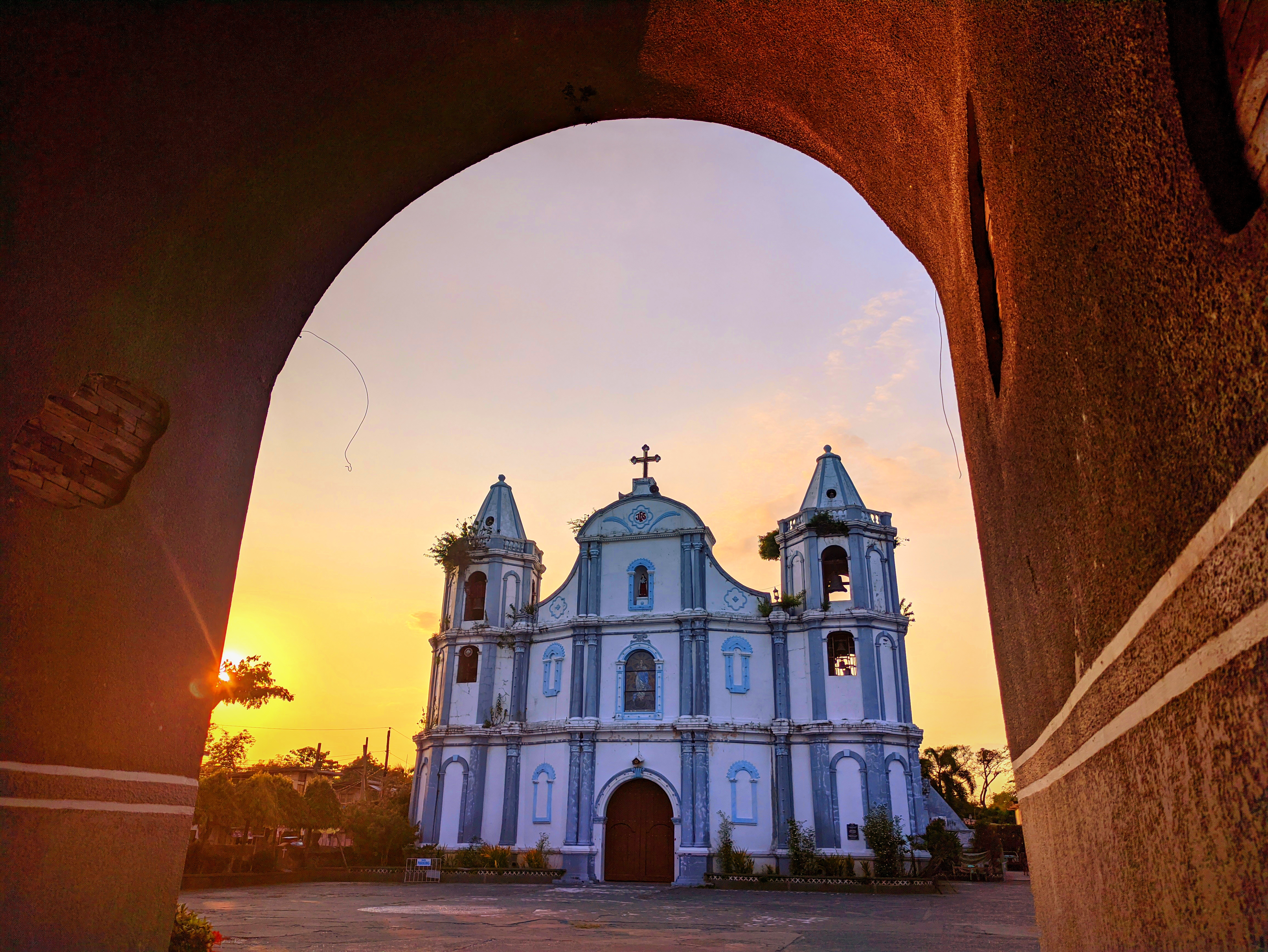
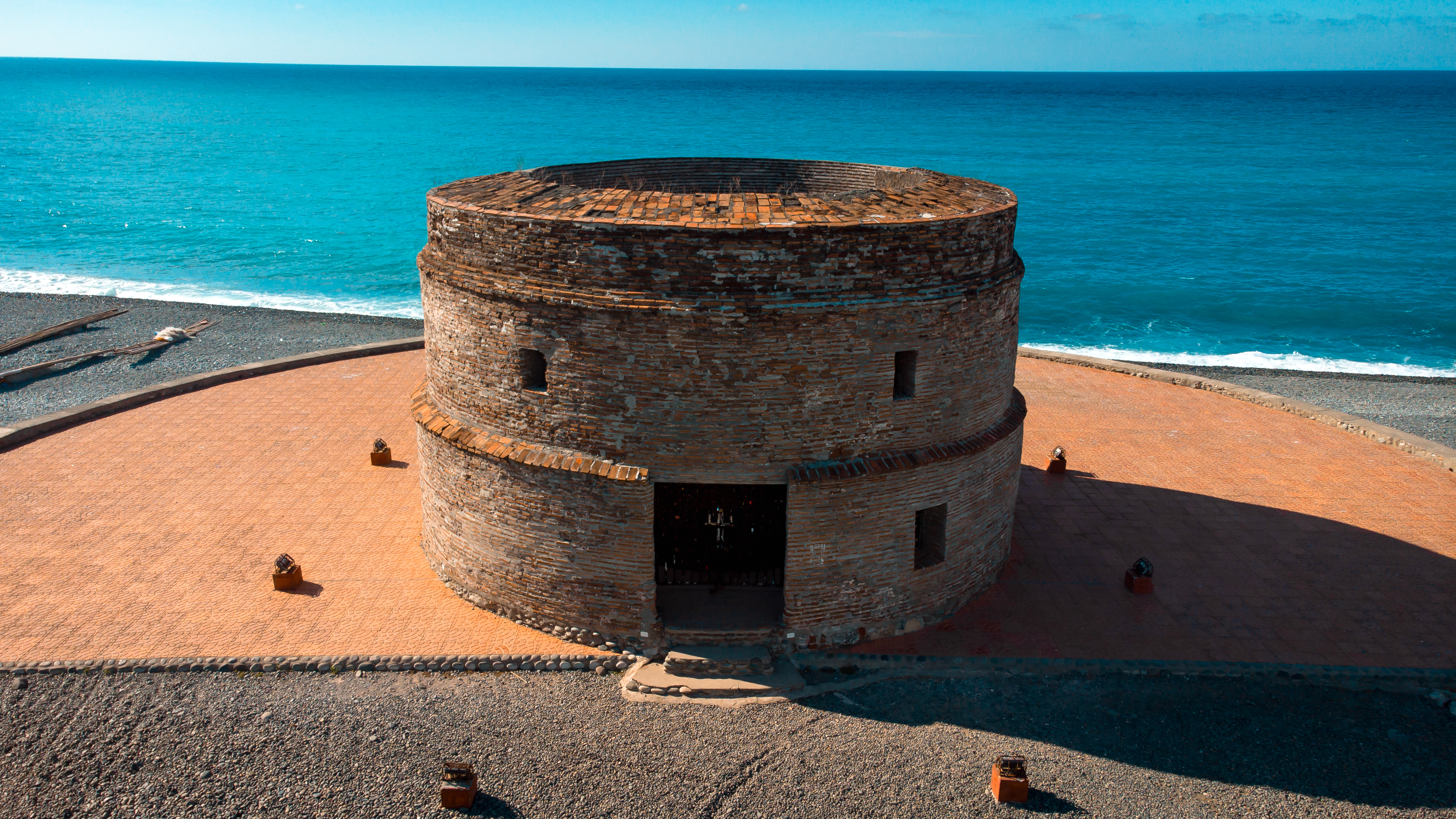
- Santa Catalina de Alejandria Church and Baluarte Watch Tower

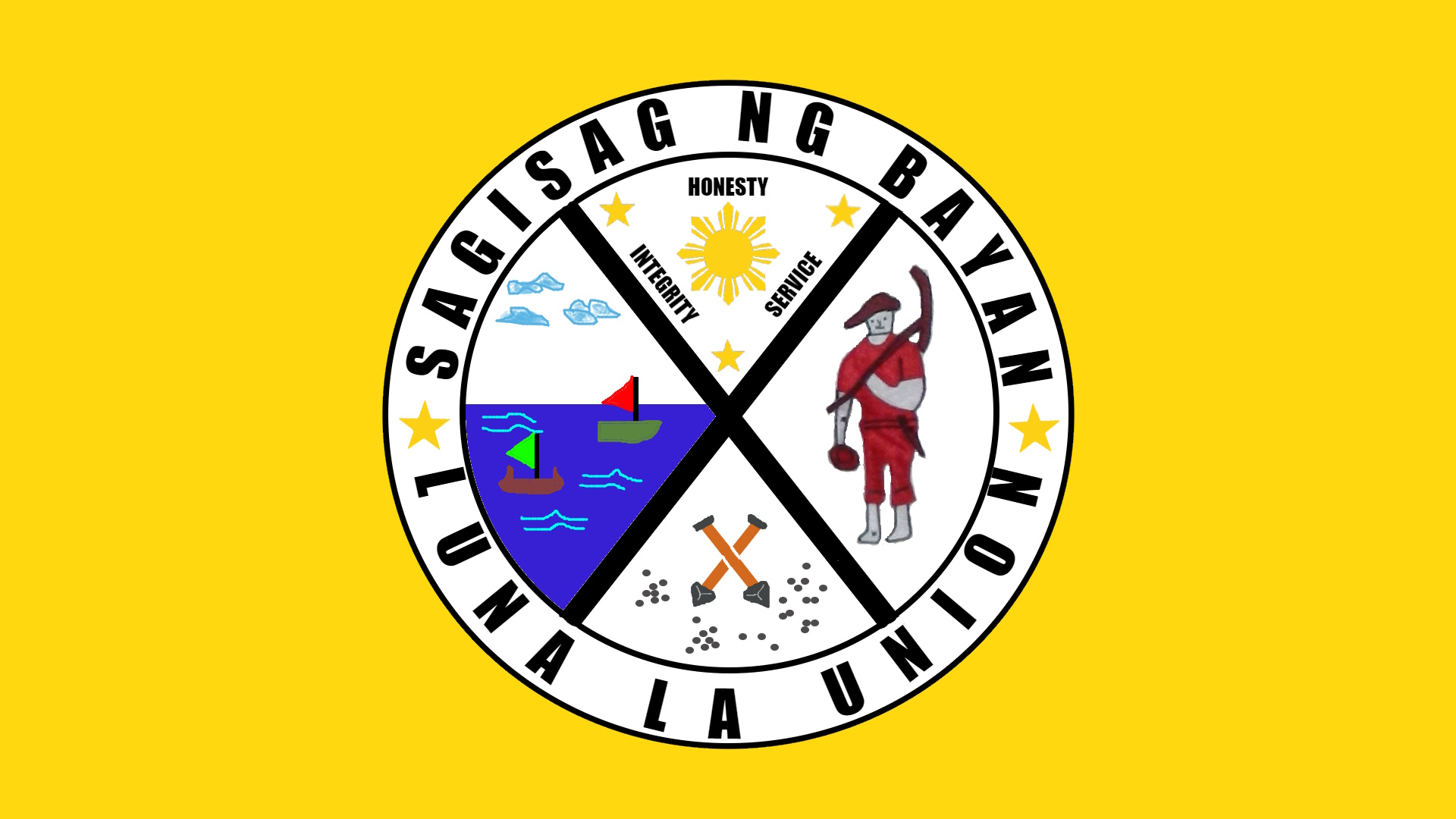
- Flag Seal
- Interactive map of Luna
- Location within the Philippines
- Coordinates: 16°51′11″N 120°22′37″E
- Country: Philippines
- Region: Ilocos Region
- Province: La Union
- District: 1st district
- Named for: Juan Luna; Antonio Luna
- Barangays: 40 (see Barangays)

Government
  - Type: Sangguniang Bayan
  - Mayor: Rachel N. Pinzon
  - Vice Mayor: Oscar B. Reyes
  - Representative: Francisco Paolo P. Ortega V
  - Municipal Council: Members: Imee V. Villa; Alex A. Nuval; Teofilo A. Nievera Jr.; Madonna A. Nera; Delfin G. Canaoay II; Robert Jeffrey N. Nobleza; Albino N. Reyes Sr.; Richard N. Flores
  - Electorate: 25,764 voters (2025)

Area
  - Total: 42.90 km^{2} (16.56 sq mi)
- Elevation: 10 m (33 ft)
- Highest elevation: 169 m (554 ft)
- Lowest elevation: 0 m (0 ft)

Population (2024 census)
  - Total: 38,076
  - Density: 887.6/km^{2} (2,299/sq mi)
  - Households: 9,756

Economy
  - Income class: 2nd municipal income class
  - Poverty incidence: 6.96% (2023)
  - Revenue: ₱ 244.6 million (2024)
  - Assets: ₱ 534.2 million (2024)
  - Expenditure: ₱ 210.3 million (2024)
  - Liabilities: ₱ 43.92 million (2024)

Service provider
  - Electricity: La Union Electric Cooperative (LUELCO)
- Time zone: UTC+8 (PST)
- ZIP code: 2518
- PSGC: 0103310000
- IDD : area code: +63 (0)72
- Native languages: Ilocano; Tagalog
- Website: www.luna.gov.ph

Luna, officially the Municipality of Luna (Ilocano: Ili ti Luna; Filipino: Bayan ng Luna), is a coastal municipality in the province of La Union, Philippines, known for its pristine pebble beaches and historical sites. According to the 2024 census, it has a population of 38,076 people.

== Etymology ==
The Town of Luna was formerly called Namacpacan. “Namacpacan” is an Iloco word which means “one who had given food.”

The town was named in honor of the Luna brothers, Antonio Luna, and Juan Luna whose mother, Laureana Novicio y Ancheta, was a native of the town. The surname Luna is of Latin origin, derived from the word lūna, meaning "moon," which symbolizes light and guidance. This etymology may be connected to the significant legacy and influence of the Luna family.

== History ==
The early history of the town can be traced back to the coastal cove area along the Darigayos, which was initially settled by the Samtoys (Ilocanos). In 1572, Spanish conquistador Juan de Salcedo arrived at a pristine white bay area known as Purao (now part of Luna and Balaoan), which means "white" in Ilocano. Salcedo attempted to persuade the natives to pay tribute to Spain, but the locals resisted foreign rule. This led to a confrontation, resulting in the first bloodshed by the Ilocanos in defiance of the Spanish. The battle ended with the defeat of the natives. In its aftermath, the river Purao was renamed Darigayos—a combination of the Ilocano words dara (blood) and ayos (flowed), signifying "where blood flowed."

By 1578, the settlement became a visita of Purao, now part of Balaoan, and was located along the camino real, the main road connecting Vigan to Manila. Travelers often stopped to rest and refresh themselves, and local families offered food and shelter, leading to the area being known for hospitality. The settlement grew over time, and on November 25, 1690, Namacpacan was formally established as a town and parish, with St. Catherine of Alexandria as its patroness. Since then, the town's patronal fiesta has been celebrated every November 25. The original town site was located in Darigayos, near a small cove that served as a harbor for sea-going vessels. In 1741, the parish was moved to its current location.

Our Lady of Namacpacan

Luna became well-known especially among Catholic devotees due to the miracles attributed to the image of Our Lady of Namacpacan. In 1871, a galleon traveling from Mexico to deliver a statue of the Blessed Virgin to the Immaculate Conception Seminary in Vigan sought shelter from a storm in Darigayos. Once the storm subsided, the galleon could not resume its journey because the sea became rough and unnavigable. The statue was brought to the local convent, and when attempts to move it failed, Fray Camilo Naves, an Augustinian priest, interpreted this as a sign that the Virgin wished her statue to remain in Namacpacan. The parishioners contributed generously, even selling portions of their fields, to raise funds for the purchase of the statue from Spain. An altar was built to house the statue of Our Lady of Namacpacan.

On October 18, 1906, under the leadership of Governor Joaquin Luna and Namacpacan Mayor Primitivo Resurreccion Novicio, the town's name was officially changed from Namacpacan to Luna by virtue of Philippine Commission Act No. 1543. This was the first name change since the creation of La Union as a province in 1850. The change was made in honor of the Luna brothers—Antonio Luna, the general, and Juan Luna, the painter—whose mother, Doña Laureana Novicio Luna, was a native of the area.

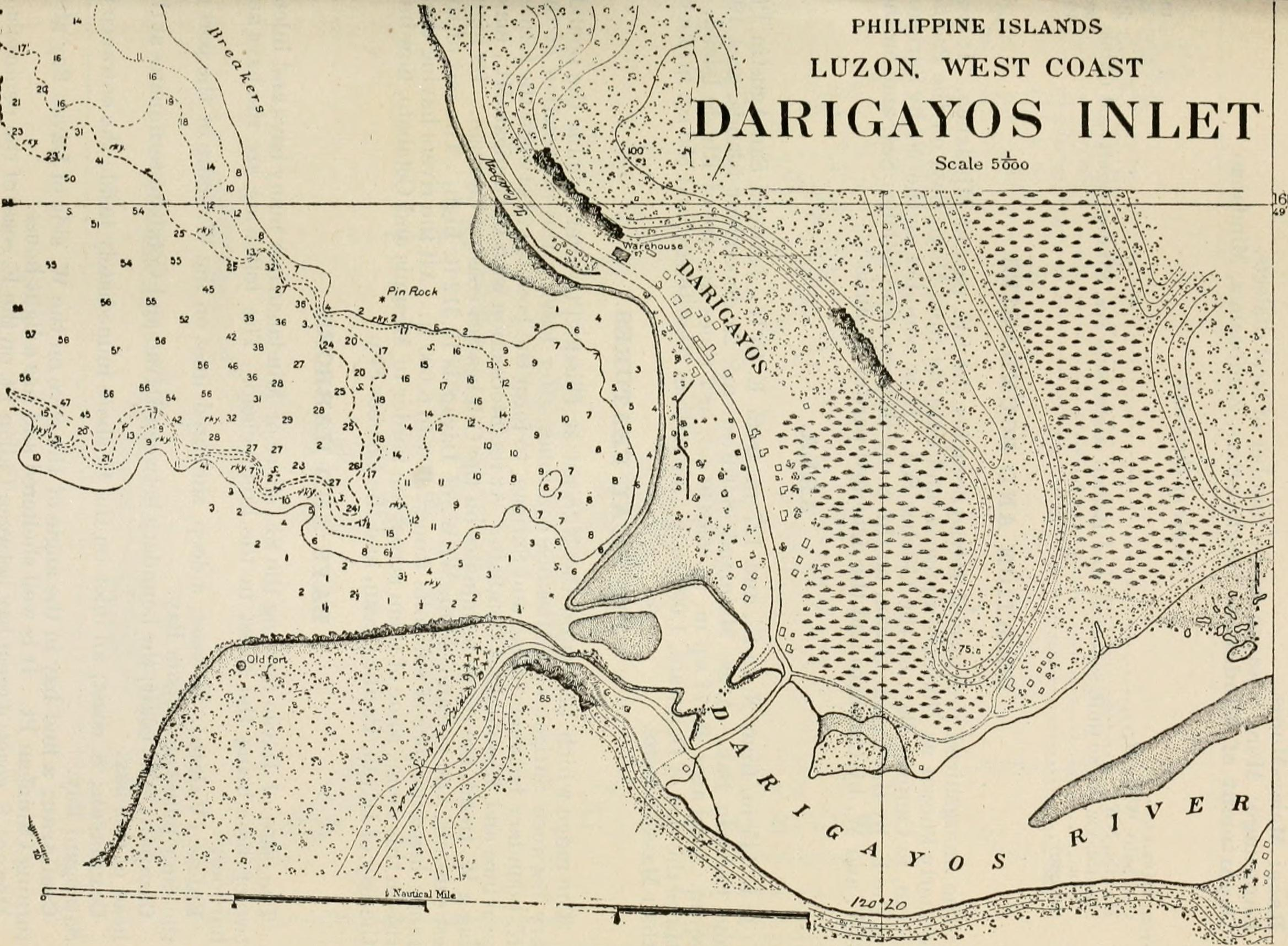
Darigayos Map circa 1902

During World War II, in the latter stages of the Japanese occupation, the general headquarters of the United States Armed Forces in the Philippines, Northern Luzon (USAFIP-NL), was transferred from Alibangsay, Bagulin, to Darigayos. A military camp, named after Private Grafton Spencer of the United States Army, was established at Camp Spencer. It was here that the USAFIP-NL planned operations and strategies for the capture of General Tomoyuki Yamashita. Camp Spencer also served as the site where Yamashita was held prisoner before his execution at the Los Baños Prisoner of War Camp.

Additionally, Darigayos was the landing site for the United States Navy submarine USS Gar, which unloaded 25 tons of ammunition, arms, communication equipment, and supplies for the USAFIP-NL. This operation, coordinated by Major Parker Calvert of the USAFIP-NL in collaboration with Filipino-American forces and the people of Luna, took place just seven kilometers from a Japanese garrison in Balaoan.

== Geography ==
The Municipality of Luna has a land area of 42.90 square kilometers (16.56 square miles), with a population density of 870 inhabitants per square kilometer (2,300 inhabitants per square mile). The town is bordered by Balaoan to the south and east, Bangar to the north, and the South China Sea to the west.

Luna is situated 33.95 kilometres (21.10 mi) from the provincial capital San Fernando, and 299.82 kilometres (186.30 mi) from the country's capital city of Manila.

=== Barangays ===
Luna is politically subdivided into 40 barangays. Each barangay consists of puroks and some have sitios.

- Alcala (poblacion)
- Ayaoan
- Barangobong
- Barrientos
- Bungro
- Buselbusel
- Cabalitocan
- Cantoria No. 1
- Cantoria No. 2
- Cantoria No. 3
- Cantoria No. 4
- Carisquis
- Darigayos
- Magallanes (poblacion)
- Magsiping
- Mamay
- Nagrebcan
- Nalvo Norte
- Nalvo Sur
- Napaset
- Oaqui No. 1
- Oaqui No. 2
- Oaqui No. 3
- Oaqui No. 4
- Pila
- Pitpitac
- Rimos No. 1
- Rimos No. 2
- Rimos No. 3
- Rimos No. 4
- Rimos No. 5
- Rissing
- Salcedo (poblacion)
- Santo Domingo Norte
- Santo Domingo Sur
- Sucoc Norte
- Sucoc Sur
- Suyo
- Tallaoen
- Victoria (poblacion)

=== Climate ===
Climate data for Luna, La Union
Month	Jan	Feb	Mar	Apr	May	Jun	Jul	Aug	Sep	Oct	Nov	Dec	Year
Mean daily maximum °C (°F)	30 (86)	31 (88)	33 (91)	34 (93)	32 (90)	31 (88)	30 (86)	30 (86)	30 (86)	31 (88)	31 (88)	31 (88)	31 (88)
Mean daily minimum °C (°F)	20 (68)	21 (70)	23 (73)	25 (77)	26 (79)	26 (79)	25 (77)	25 (77)	25 (77)	23 (73)	22 (72)	21 (70)	24 (74)
Average precipitation mm (inches)	27 (1.1)	31 (1.2)	40 (1.6)	71 (2.8)	207 (8.1)	237 (9.3)	286 (11.3)	261 (10.3)	261 (10.3)	254 (10.0)	88 (3.5)	46 (1.8)	1,809 (71.3)
Average rainy days	9.4	9.3	12.7	17.0	25.4	26.8	27.4	26.1	25.0	21.0	15.5	10.6	226.2
Source: Meteoblue

== Demographics ==
Population census of Luna
Year	Pop.	±% p.a.
1903	11,116	—
1918	13,542	+1.32%
1939	14,624	+0.37%
1948	17,258	+1.86%
1960	18,595	+0.62%
1970	22,767	+2.04%
1975	24,065	+1.12%
1980	25,081	+0.83%
1990	28,308	+1.22%
1995	29,974	+1.08%
2000	32,259	+1.59%
2007	35,372	+1.28%
2010	35,380	+0.01%
2015	35,802	+0.23%
2020	37,318	+0.88%
2024	38,076	+0.48%
Source: Philippine Statistics Authority

In the 2020 census, the population of Luna was 37,318 people, with a density of 870 inhabitants per square kilometre or 2,300 inhabitants per square mile.

== Economy ==
The economy of Luna is primarily based on agriculture, with rice farming and fishing being the main sources of livelihood for its residents. Rice is cultivated two to three times a year in some areas, and in between cropping seasons, locals grow vegetables and root crops. Fishing, particularly along the coastal areas, is the second most important occupation, with various kinds of fish, seaweed, and shellfish found abundantly in Luna's seawater.

In addition to farming and fishing, Luna is known for its stone-picking industry, which serves as the primary source of income for 14 of its barangays. These stones are sold not only locally but also exported overseas.

The town also has a thriving small-scale industry producing traditional Ilocano products, including basi (sugarcane wine), sukang Iloko (sugarcane vinegar), and bugguong (fermented fish). Luna is also recognized for its famous Ilocano delicacies such as bibingka (rice cake) and tupig (grilled rice cake), which are popular among both locals and visitors. Additionally, the Damili (pottery) industry, producing clay products such as burnay (earthen jar) and dalikan (earthen stove), is active in Barangay Barrientos.

Tourism also plays a role in the local economy, with attractions such as the Bahay na Bato, Baluarte Watchtower and the Namacpacan Church drawing visitors to the town.

Poverty incidence of Luna (%)

Source: Philippine Statistics Authority

== Government ==
=== Local government ===
Luna, belonging to the first congressional district of the province of La Union, is governed by a mayor designated as its local chief executive and by a municipal council as its legislative body in accordance with the Local Government Code. The mayor, vice mayor, and the councilors are elected directly by the people through an election which is being held every three years.

=== Elected officials ===
Members of the Municipal Council (2019–2022)
Position	Name
Congressman	Pablo C. Ortega
Mayor	Gary N. Pinzon
Vice-Mayor	Romeo L. Resurreccion
Councilors	Decson C. Galvez
Councilors	Imee V. Villa
Councilors	Zaldy Ramirez
Councilors	Beverly M. Kim
Councilors	Albino N. Reyes Sr.
Councilors	Robert Jeffrey N. Nobleza
Councilors	Alex A. Nuval
Councilors	Richard N. Flores

== Tourist attractions ==
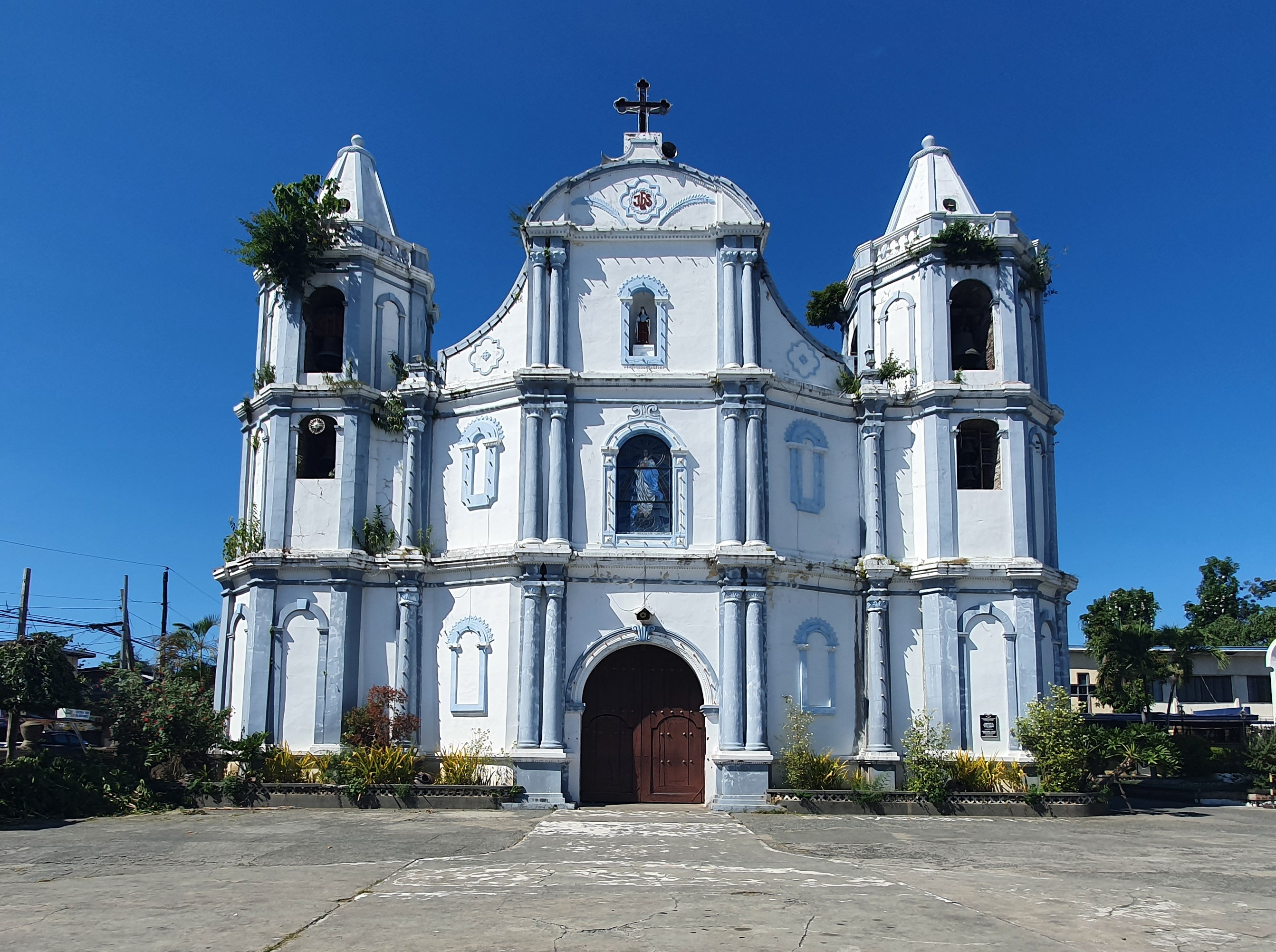
Shrine of Our Lady of Namacpacan

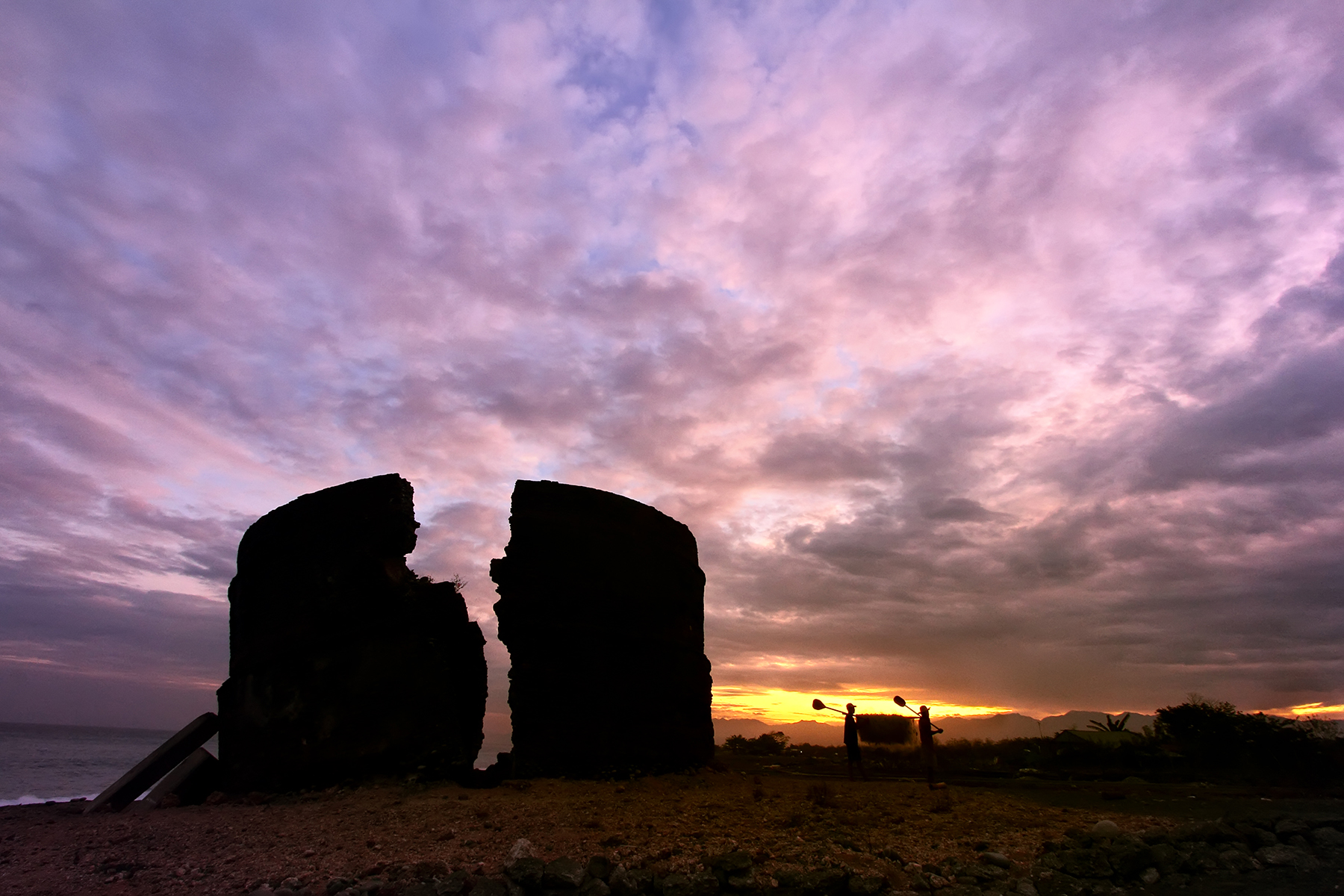
Baluarte, an old Spanish watch tower

Luna is also known for its pebble beaches, particularly in Nalvo Sur and Darigayos. Beach shades, cottages and resorts are found in these barangays. The municipality is also known for its native delicacies and pottery products which are comparable to San Juan's.

The town is a pilgrimage site as it enshrines the Apo Baket Namacpacan, a wooden Marian image.

On the beach of barangay Victoria rests the ruins of an old Spanish watchtower, locally named as Balauarte. The tower was intended to guard the shores of the town primarily from Muslim and pirate attacks during the Spanish period. During World War II, the tower served as the communication tower post for a temporary airfield for the USAFIP-NL forces. Due to years of quarrying within the site of the tower (1980 to 2000), the coastline receded and sea waves severely damaged the foundation of the tower, which eventually caused major damage to its structure. At present, efforts were initiated to preserve the tower from further damage.

== Education ==
There are two schools district offices which govern all educational institutions within the municipality. The offices oversee the management and operations of all private and public elementary and high schools. Theres are the Luna I Schools District Office, and Luna II Schools District Office.

Luna has Public Elementary schools in each barangay except Barangobong. There are 6 public high schools (Luna National Science High School - Central in Barangay Barrientos, LNHS - Rimos and Cantoria Annex; and Oanari National High School) Bungro-Sucoc Integrated School in Bungro, Luna Technical Vocational High School and 1 Private High School (Santa Catalina Academy).

=== Primary and elementary schools ===
- Ayaoan Elementary School
- Barrientos Elementary School
- Busel-Busel Elementary School
- Cabalitocan Elementary School
- Cantoria Central School
- Darigayos Elementary School
- Luna Central School
- Nagrebcan Elementary School
- Nalvo Norte Elementary School
- Nalvo Sur Elementary School
- Oaqui Elementary School
- Pila Elementary School
- Pitpitac Elementary School
- Rimos del Norte Elementary School
- Rimos Elementary School
- Santa Catalina Academy
- Sto. Domingo Elementary School
- Sucoc Norte Elementary School
- Suyo Elementary School
- Tallaoen Elementary School

=== Secondary schools ===
- Bungro-Sucoc Integrated School
- Canbarbusuy National High School
- Luna National High School
- Luna National Vocational High School
- Oanari National High School
- Rimos National High School
- Sta. Catalina Academy

== Gallery ==
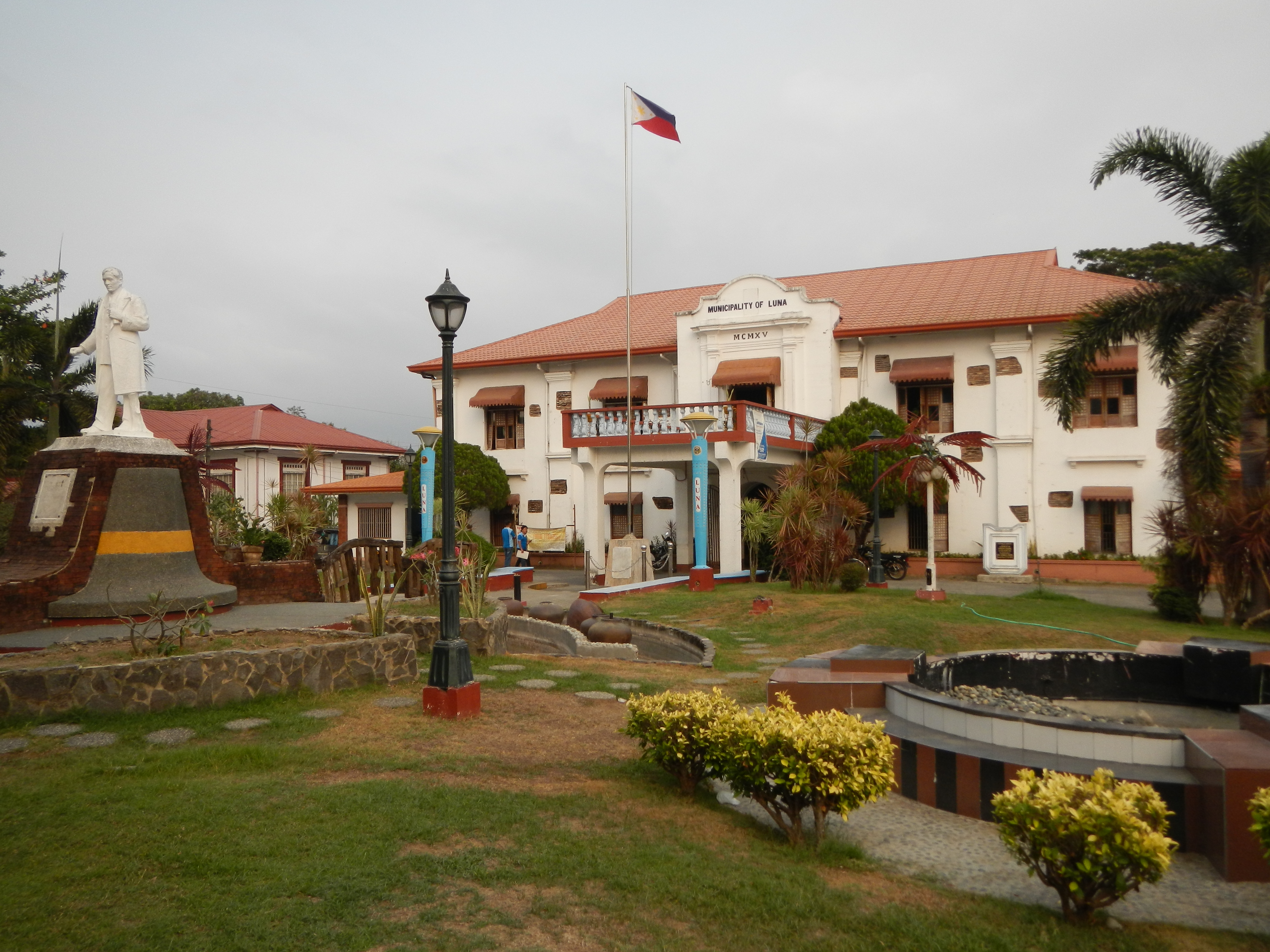
Municipal hall

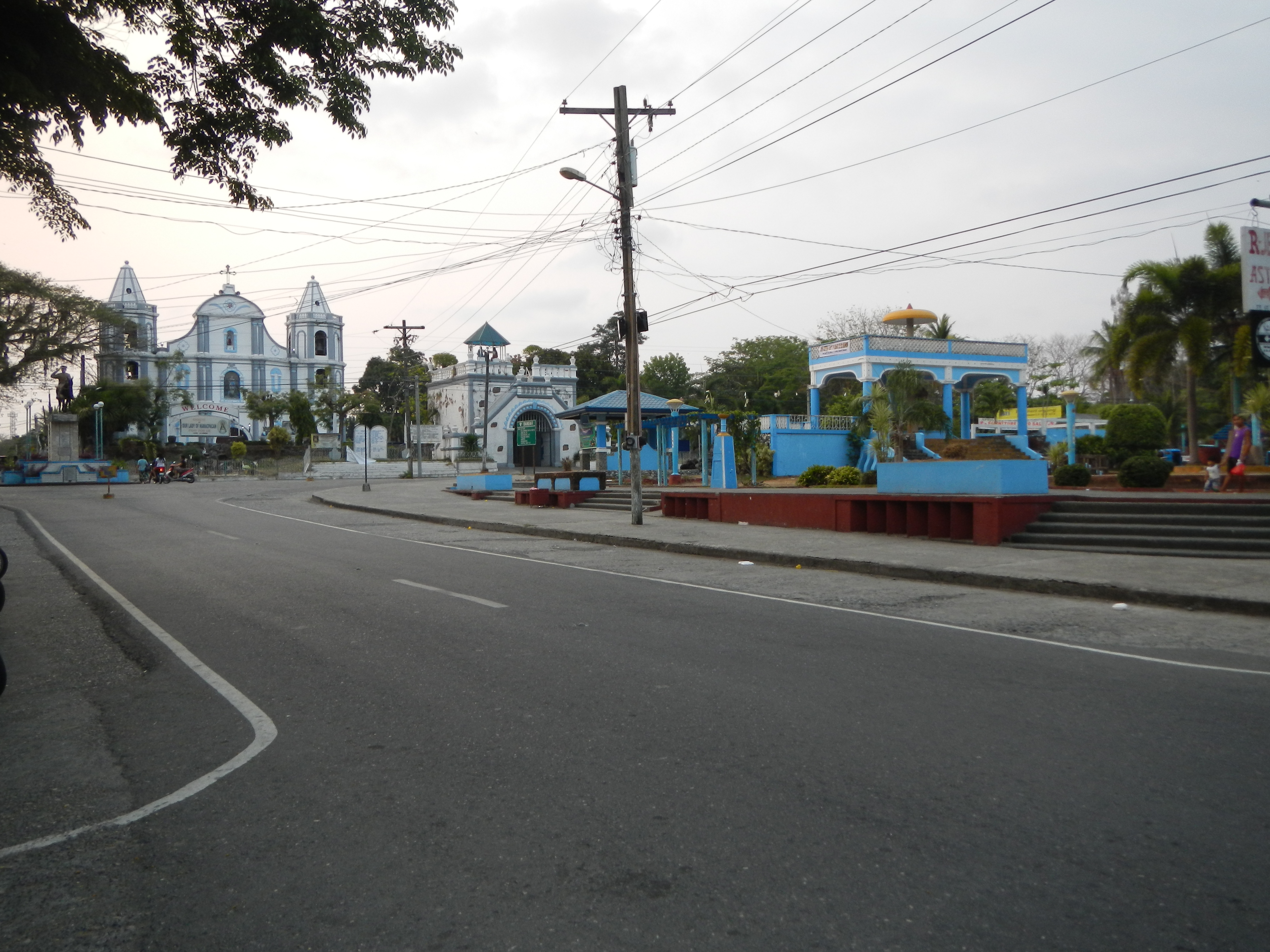
Luna town center overlooking the Santa Catalina de Alejandria Church

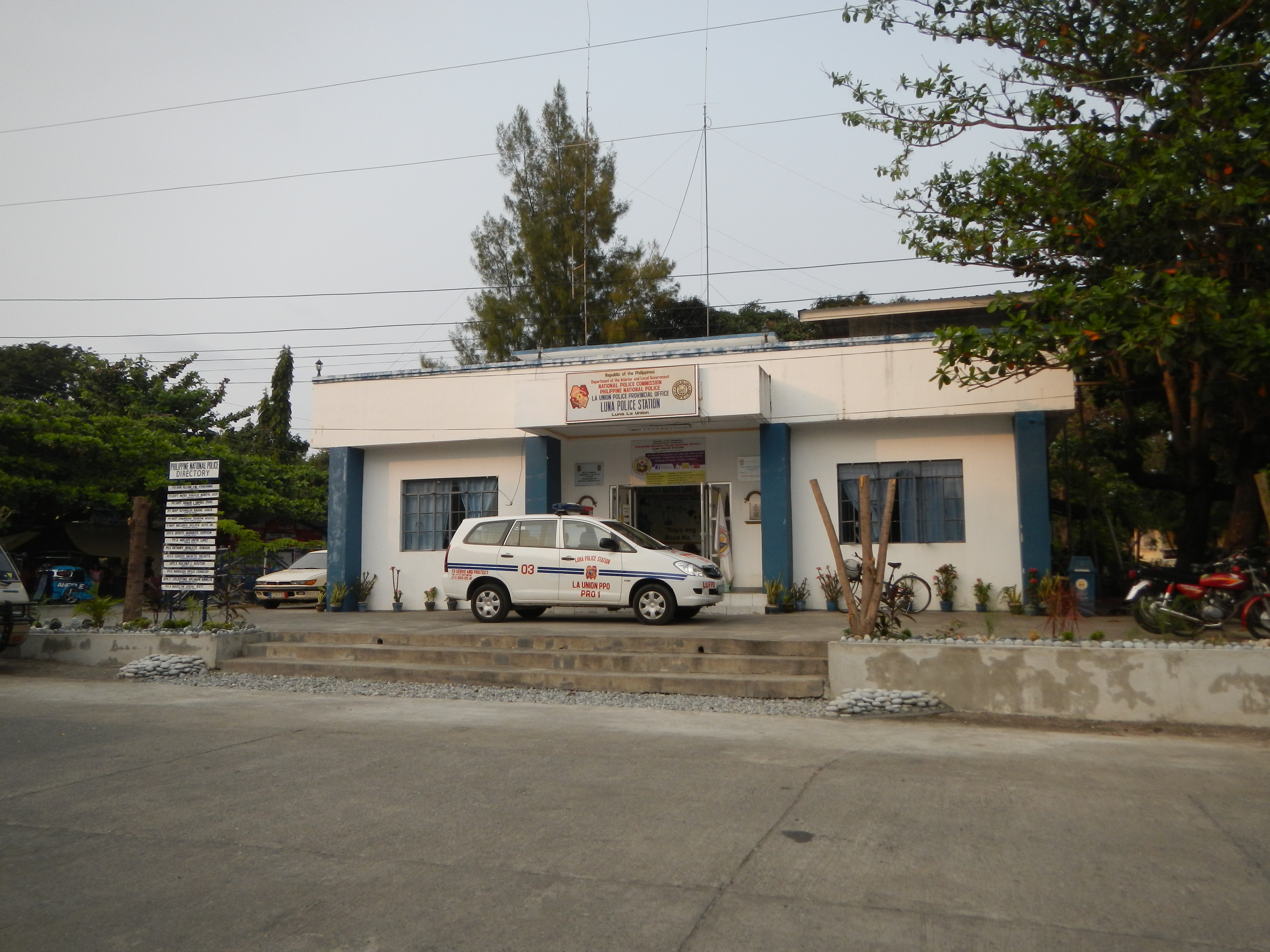
Police station

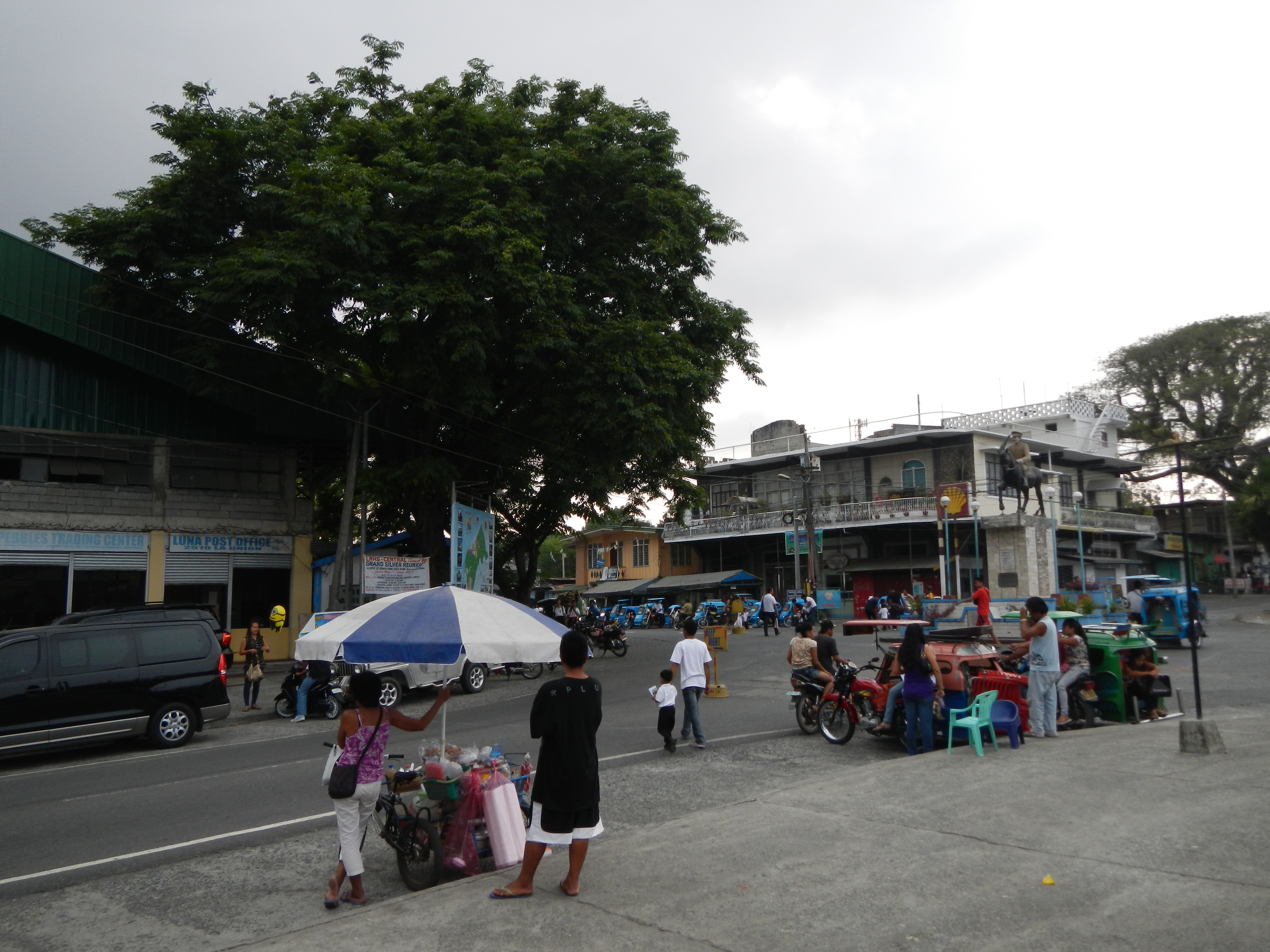
Town center

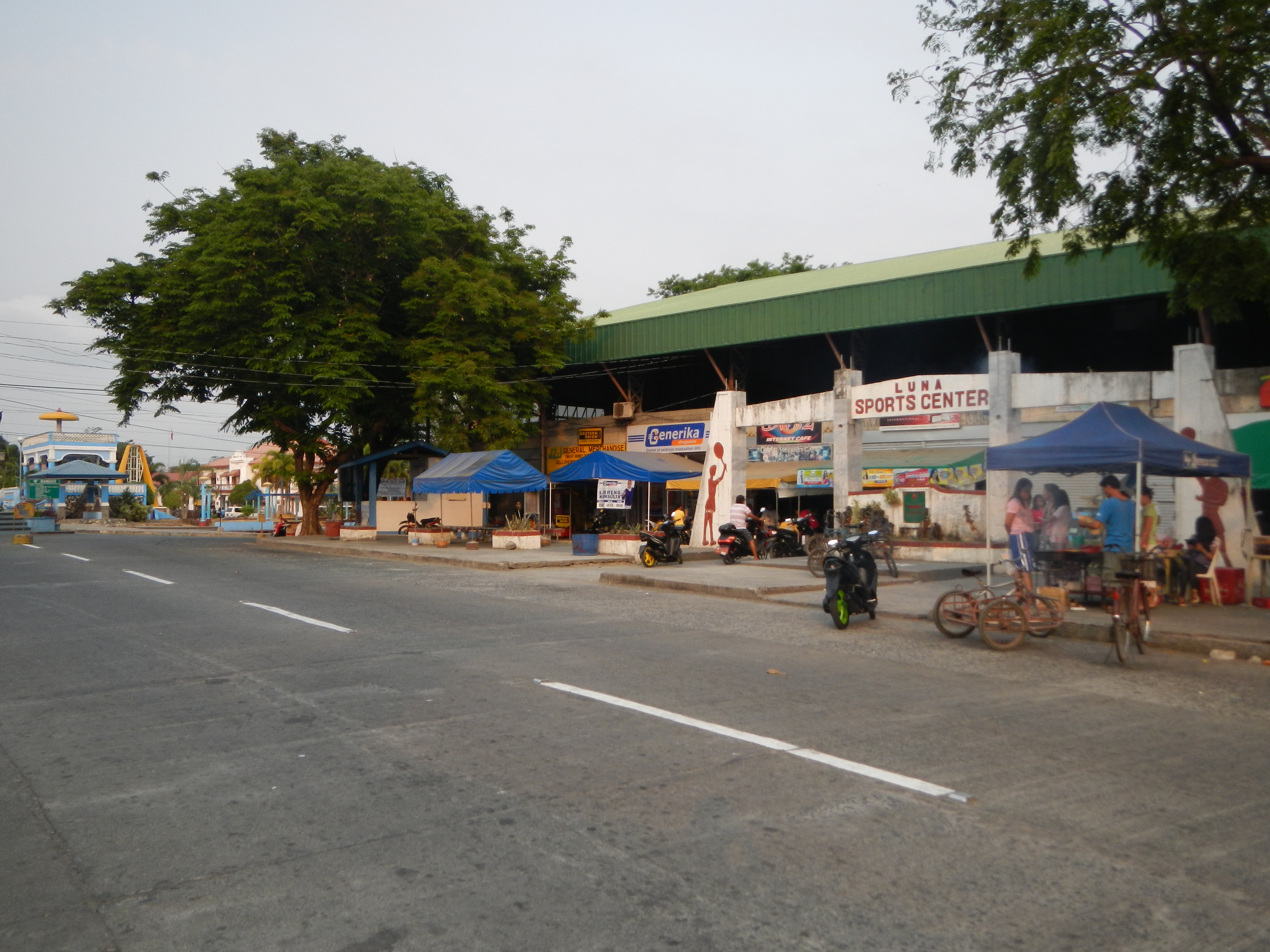
Luna Sports Center

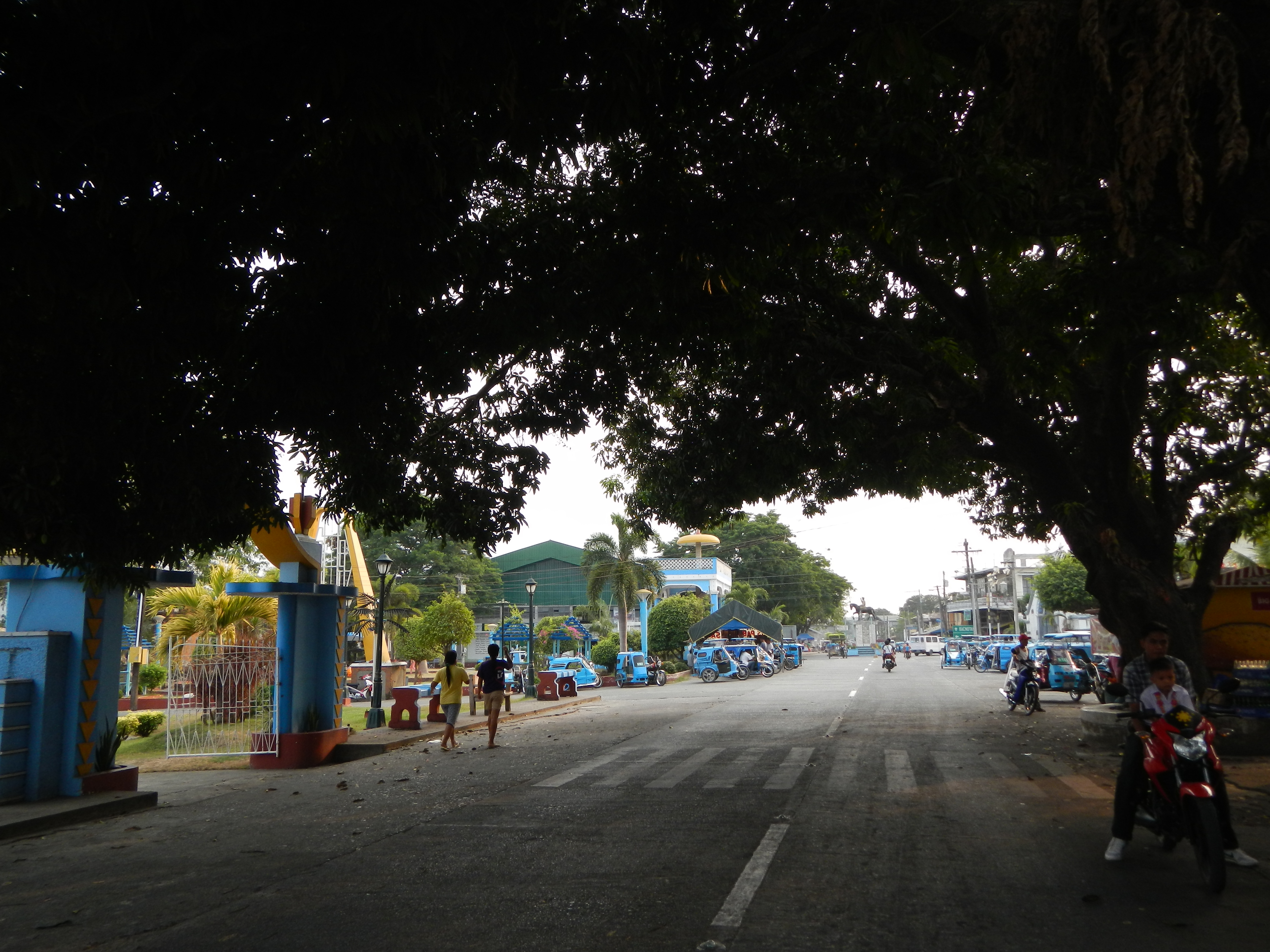
Street view
