= Namacpacan Church =

Roman Catholic church in La Union, Philippines

- Saint Catherine of Alexandria Parish Church; Shrine of Our Lady of Namacpacan
- Iglesia Parroquial de Santa Catalina de Alejandría (Spanish)
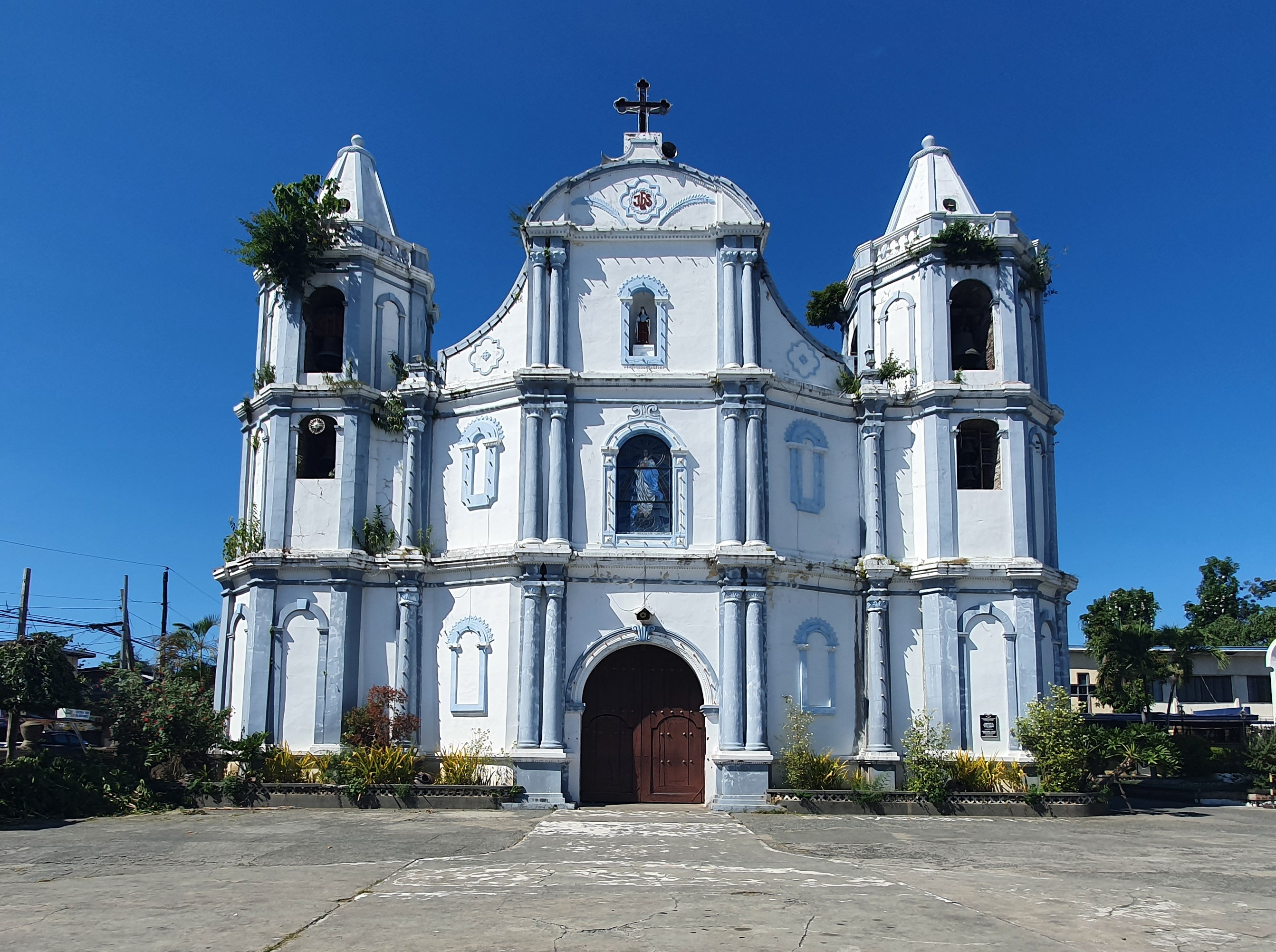
- Church facade in 2020

- Location in Luzon Location in the Philippines
- 16°51′12″N 120°22′35″E
- Location: Brgy. Victoria, Luna
- Country: Philippines
- Denomination: Roman Catholic

History
- Former name: Luna Church
- Status: Parish church
- Founded: 1690
- Dedication: Saint Catherine of Alexandria

Architecture
- Functional status: Active
- Heritage designation: National Cultural Treasure
- Architectural type: Church building
- Style: Earthquake Baroque

Administration
- Province: Lingayen-Dagupan
- Archdiocese: Lingayen-Dagupan
- Diocese: San Fernando de La Union

Clergy
- Archbishop: Socrates B. Villegas
- Bishop: Daniel O. Presto

Saint Catherine of Alexandria Parish Church, also known as the Shrine of Our Lady of Namacpacan and Namacpacan Church, is a Roman Catholic church located in Luna (formerly Namacpacan), La Union, Philippines under the jurisdiction of the Diocese of San Fernando de La Union. Once called Luna Church, its titular is Saint Catherine of Alexandria. Built in 1690, it is also known as the shrine for the image of Our Lady of the Immaculate Conception of Namacpacan.

The church was declared a National Cultural Treasure by the National Museum of the Philippines.

== History ==
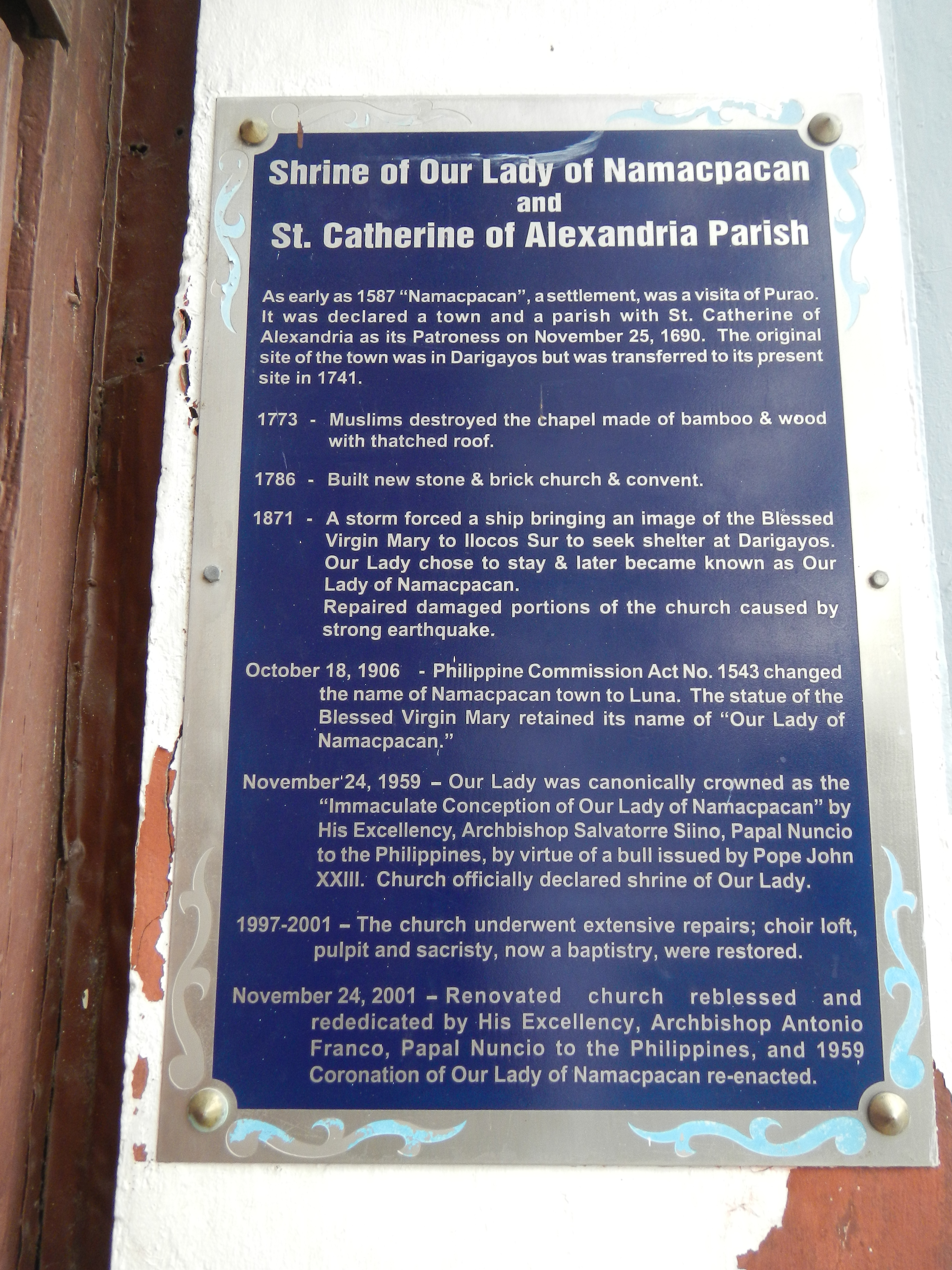
Church local historical marker

Saint Catherine of Alexandria, the town's Patron Saint

Since 1587, Namacpacan was a visita of Purao (presently known as Balaoan). In November 25, 1690, the town was founded and a parish under the advocacy of Saint Catherine of Alexandria was canonically erected. The first church of Namacpacan was built under the supervision of Father Mateo Bustillos, the parish priest from 1695 to 1697. The original site of the church was in Darigayos, a barrio of Namacpacan and was transferred in 1741 to its present site. The image of the Our Lady of Namacpacan was enshrined in the church in 1871.

The church was reinforced with masonry and galvanized iron roof. It was heavily destroyed by an earthquake in 1854. Through the efforts of Father Marcelino Ceballes, the church was restored and the convent was widened in 1876.

== Architecture ==
Like other Philippine churches built in earthquake-prone areas, Namacpacan Church is classified as an Earthquake Baroque church with thick walls and buttresses connected to a brick exterior stairway of different designs and shapes. A ceremonial archway or capilla possa can be found at the church's entrance. Its 1872 white and yellow facade falls under the Baroque style with the presence of rounded pediments. Three sets of two pairs of engaged columns and two sets of single columns along with twin belfries adorning the façade. A wooden altar, Spanish-era stone pulpit and a wood relief of the Baptism of Christ, probably polychromed, can be found inside the church.

Its convento is now used as a school.

== Marian devotion and veneration ==
The altar of Our Lady of Namacpacan

=== History ===
The wooden image of the Blessed Virgin Mary venerated as the Our Lady of Immaculate Conception of Namacpacan, addressed in Ilocano as Apo Baket, was ordered in 1871 from Spain by an Augustinian priest assigned to the Immaculate Conception Seminary in Vigan. During transit, the galleon ship from Mexico carrying the image took shelter in Darigayos due to a storm. When the sea calmed, they resumed their journey but strong winds forced them to return to Darigayos. The ship’s captain decided to have the image transported by land and it was temporarily placed in the town church’s convento. However, the image became too heavy to be transferred onwards; Father Camilo Naves, an Augustinian priest, interpreted these as signs from the Virgin Mary that she wanted her image to be enshrined in Namacpacan. Father Marcelino Ceballos, the parish priest, requested the Augustinians give the image to the town. When the people of Namacpacan agreed to reimburse all expenses incurred during the image's journey from Spain, its owner finally gave it to them. The people welcomed the Virgin with feasting, and enshrined her on an altar in the north part of their church.

Pope John XXIII granted a pontifical decree of coronation to Bishop Juan Callanta y Sison on September 7, 1959, signed by Canon Secretary Giulio Barbella and notarized by Secretary of Apostolic Dataria Marco Martini. The image was canonically crowned on November 24, 1959, by the Apostolic Nuncio to the Philippines, Salvatore Siino.

The image of Our Lady of Namacpacan, standing 6 feet 4 inches (1.92 m) tall, is the tallest-known Marian image in the Philippines and is invoked as patroness of Ilocano travellers.

=== Alleged miracles ===
The statue of Our Lady of Namacpacan

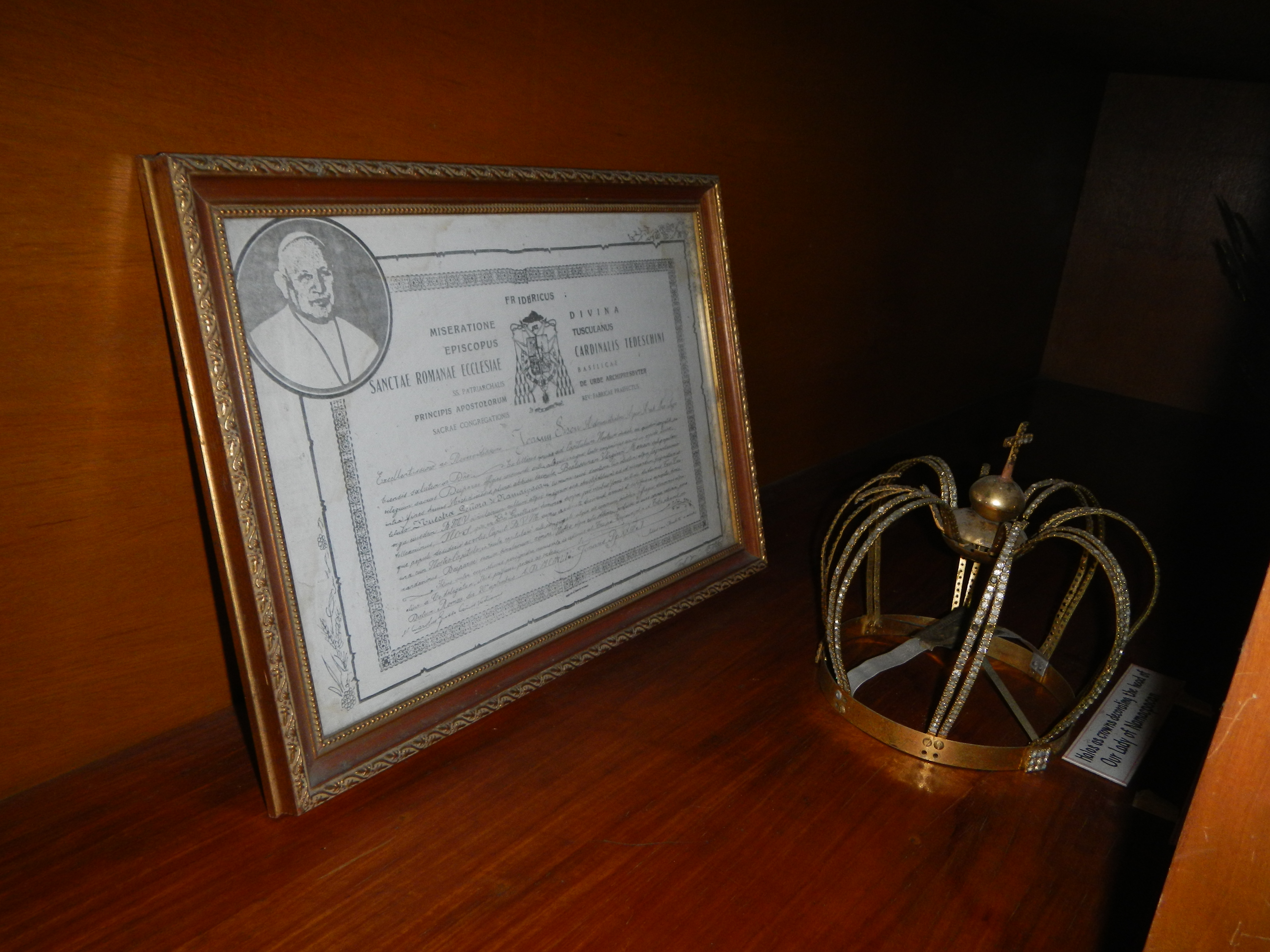
The decree for the canonical coronation of the image

Several miracles attributed to the Virgin of Namacpacan are widely known, including the healing of a young girl named Rosa Roldán, who was unable to walk since birth.

Before Pope Pius XII died on October 9, 1958, he had reportedly dreamt of the Virgin of Namacpacan. He asked where "Namacpacan" was, but none of his staff were aware; it was only after the pontiff's death did Church officials learn of the image and its location.

== Bibliography ==
- Dela Torre, Visitacion (2006). The Ilocos Heritage. Makati City: Tower Book House. ISBN 978-971-91030-9-7.
- Barcelona, Mary Anne; Estepa, Consuelo (2004). Ynang Maria: A Celebration of the Blessed Virgin Mary in the Philippines. Anvil Publishing. ISBN 9789712713927.
- Legarda, Benita (1960). "Colonial Churches of Ilocos". Philippine Studies. 8 (1). Ateneo de Manila University: 121–158.
- Layug, Benjamin Locsin (2007). A Tourist Guide to Notable Philippine Churches. New Day Publishers. p. 26. ISBN 9789711011680.
- Southeast Asia. Insight Guide. 1998. p. 319. ISBN 978-0-88729-151-7.
