= Balaoan =

Municipality in La Union, Philippines

- Municipality
- Municipality of Balaoan
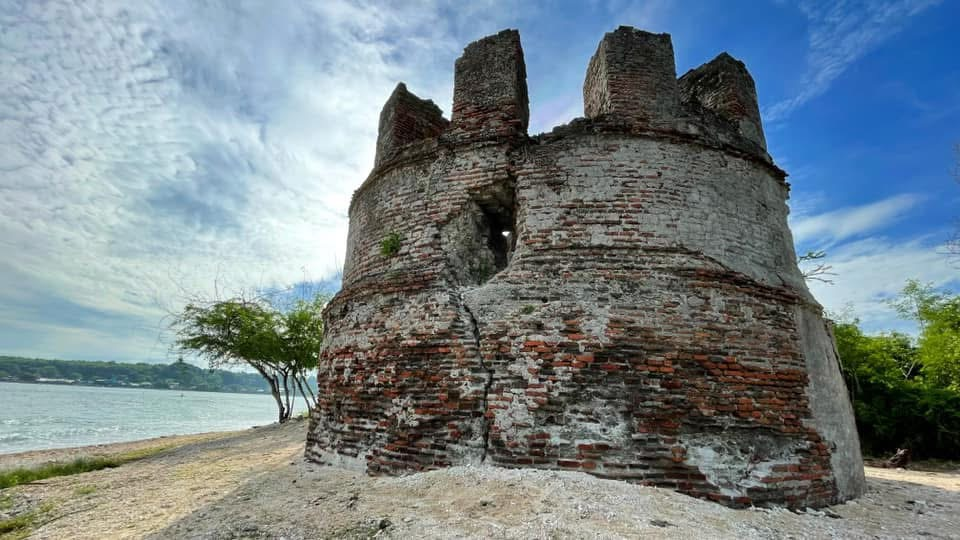
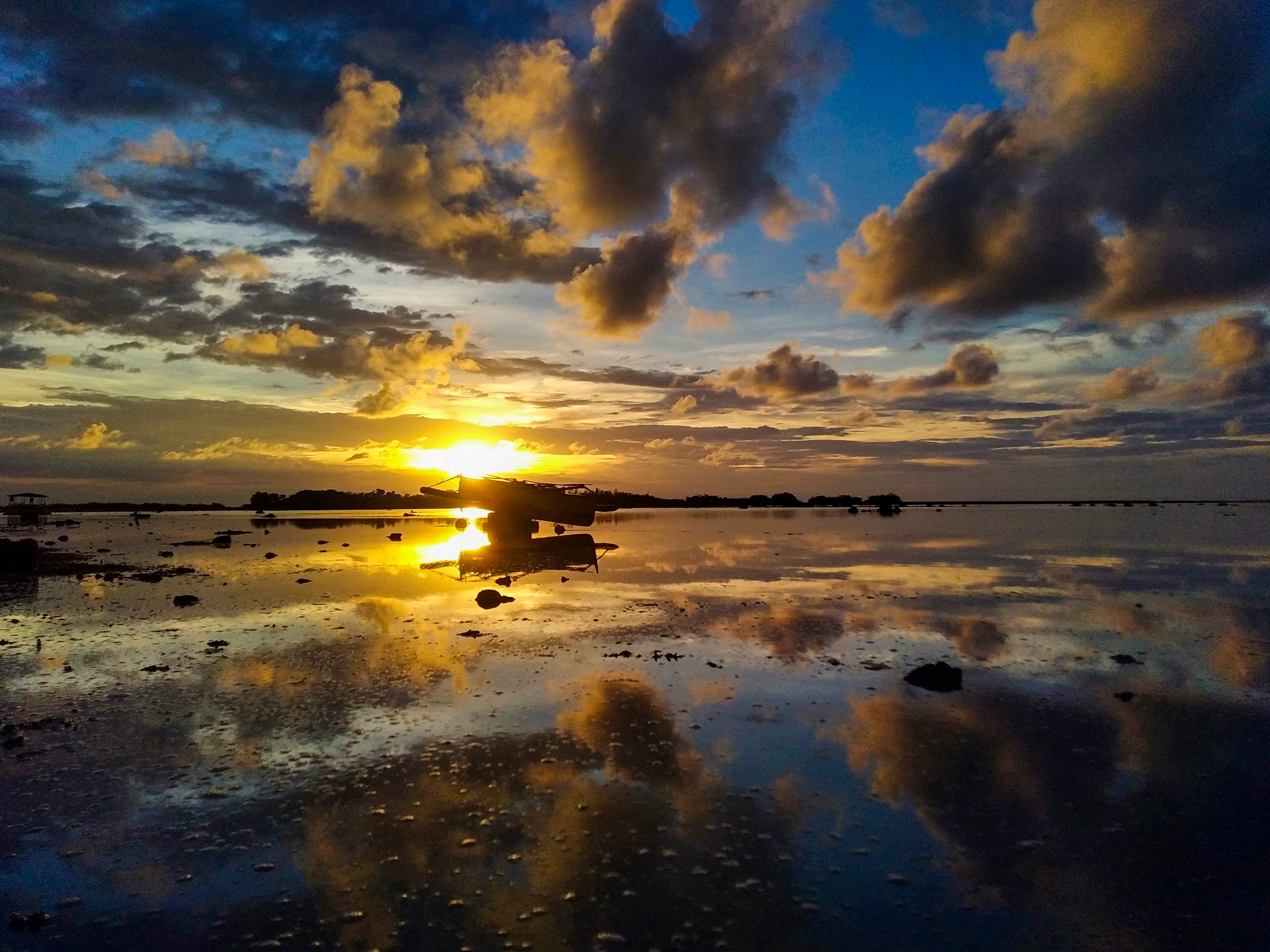
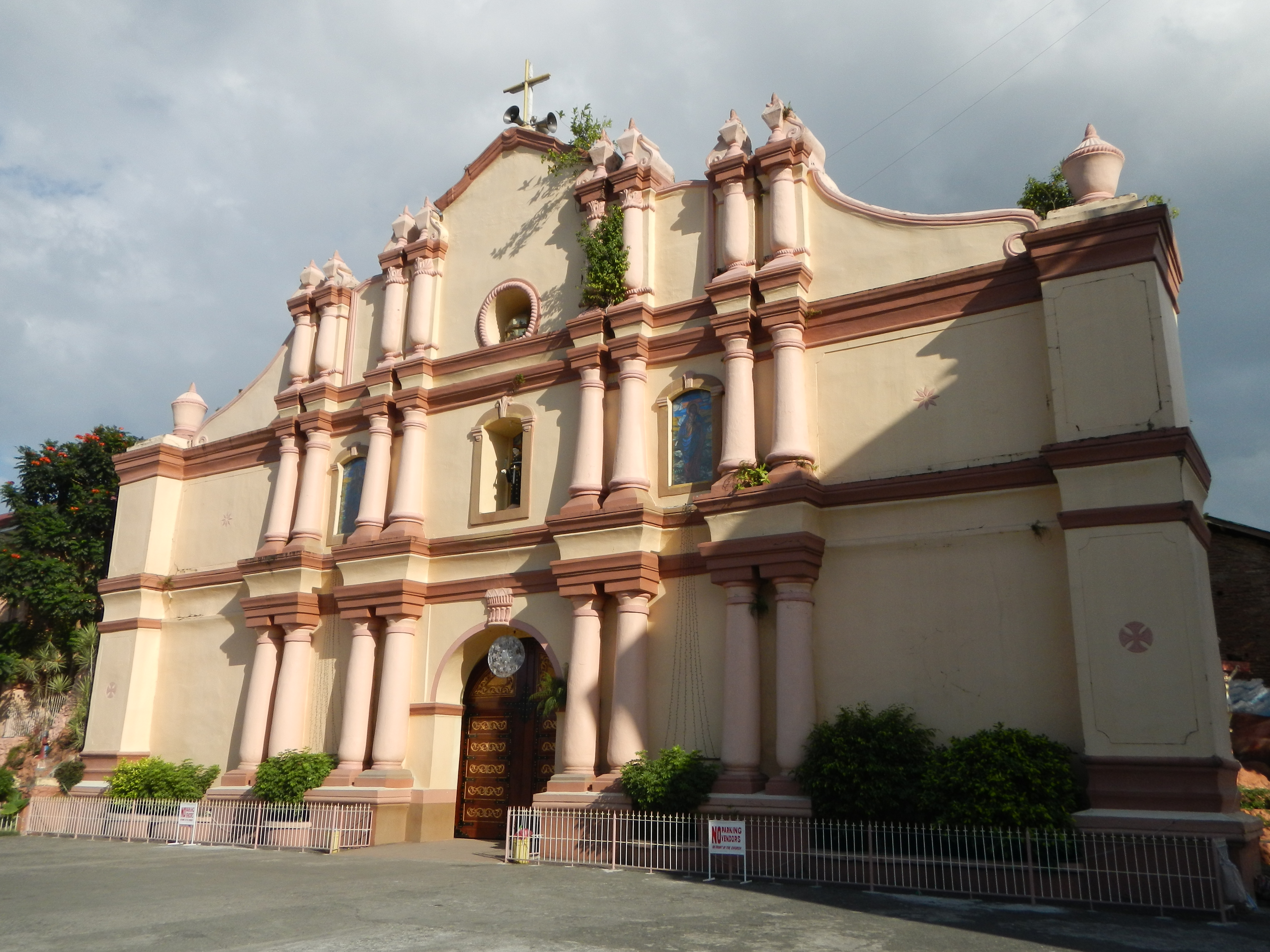
- Almeida Watchtower, Sunset in Immuki Island & Saint Nicholas of Tolentino Parish Church

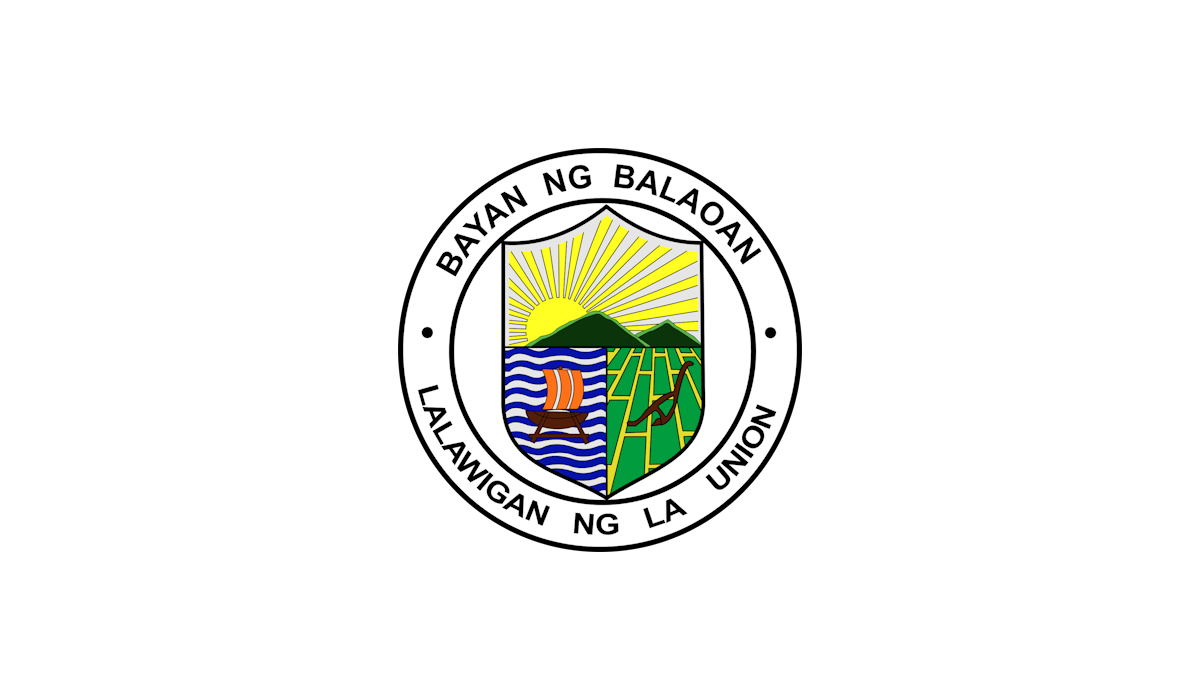
- Flag Seal
- Nickname: The Sea Urchin Capital of the North
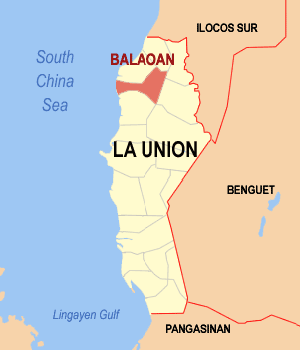
- Map of La Union with Balaoan highlighted
- Interactive map of Balaoan
- Location within the Philippines
- Coordinates: 16°49′19″N 120°24′11″E
- Country: Philippines
- Region: Ilocos Region
- Province: La Union
- District: 1st district
- Founded: 1704
- Barangays: 36 (see Barangays)

Government
  - Type: Sangguniang Bayan
  - Mayor: Carlo Castor U. Concepcion
  - Vice Mayor: Aleli U. Concepcion
  - Representative: Francisco Paolo P. Ortega V
  - Municipal Council: Members: Joanna Katrina L. Ledda; Rogelio O. Concepcion; Rogelio E. Opinaldo; Michael D. Marron; Rosie M. Is-isa; Herminia M. Ordinario; Emiliana P. Portacio; Marife C. Hermosura
  - Electorate: 27,048 voters (2025)

Area
  - Total: 68.70 km^{2} (26.53 sq mi)
- Elevation: 47 m (154 ft)
- Highest elevation: 311 m (1,020 ft)
- Lowest elevation: 0 m (0 ft)

Population (2024 census)
  - Total: 40,440
  - Density: 588.6/km^{2} (1,525/sq mi)
  - Households: 10,204

Economy
  - Income class: 1st municipal income class
  - Poverty incidence: 7.85% (2023)
  - Revenue: ▲PHP 1,067,287,083.40 billion (410.46%) (2021)
  - Assets: ▲PHP 1,757,187,696.71 billion (99.14%) (2021)
  - Equity: ▲PHP 1,700,436,716.76 billion (112.55%) (2021)
  - Expenditure: ▼PHP 175,850,099.75 million (-42.80%) (2021)
  - Liabilities: ▼PHP 56,750,979.95 million (-31.10%) (2021)

Service provider
  - Electricity: La Union Electric Cooperative (LUELCO)
- Time zone: UTC+8 (PST)
- ZIP code: 2517
- PSGC: 0103305000
- IDD : area code: +63 (0)72
- Native languages: Ilocano; Tagalog
- Website: www.balaoan.gov.ph

Balaoan, officially the Municipality of Balaoan (Ilocano: Ili ti Balaoan; Filipino: Bayan ng Balaoan), is a coastal municipality in the province of La Union, Philippines. According to the 2024 census, it has a population of 40,440 people.

== Etymology ==
The name "Balaoan" is derived from the Iloco words bala, meaning "bullets," and aoan or awan, meaning "none" or "no more." Historical records show that the town's name has also been spelled as "Balauan" or "Balaoang" in earlier times. One account attributes the name to the bravery of early Ilocano settlers who defended their territory against invaders armed with superior weaponry. When their supply of ammunition was exhausted, they continued to fight with bolos and bare hands, shouting “Bala! Aoan!” (“Bullets! No more!”). This act of resilience is believed to have inspired the town's name.

Another interpretation suggests a more playful origin. It is said that local inhabitants teased Spanish soldiers who patrolled the area by asking, “Aoan bala?” (“No bullets?”), referring to whether their firearms were loaded. Over time, the phrase evolved into "Balaoan," which became the official name of the town.

Several barangays in Balaoan also have names that hold historical or cultural significance.

The barangay Dr. Camilo Osias (Poblacion) is named after Dr. Camilo Osias, a native of the town who was a distinguished Filipino politician and twice served briefly as President of the Senate of the Philippines.

Nagsabaran, composed of Nagsabaran Norte and Nagsabaran Sur, is derived from the Ilocano word sabar, meaning "to branch out," referencing the national road that diverges in this area. Pantar, which includes Pantar Norte and Pantar Sur, originates from the Ilocano term pantar, meaning "lively."

== History ==
=== Early history ===
The early history of town, centers around a settlement of the Samtoy people (Ilocanos) along its pristine white coastal bay, known as Purao (Puraw), which means "white" in the Iloco language. This settlement was a flourishing emporium for trade between the lowlanders and the highland Igorots, exchanging gold, porcelain, silk (abel), cotton, beeswax, honey, beads, precious minerals, and locally crafted burnáy (stoneware jars) to its neighboring such as the Igorots and Pangasinans even the Chinese and Japanese. Historian William Henry Scott noted that, as early as 1592, Balaoan was recognized as being "rich in gold" due to its proximity to the gold mines of the Cordilleras.

In 1572, Spanish conquistador Juan de Salcedo arrived at Purao and attempted to persuade the natives to pay tribute to Spain. The locals resisted, leading to a confrontation that resulted in bloodshed. Following the battle, the river Purao was renamed "Darigayos" (now part of Luna, La Union), derived from the Iloco words dara (blood) and ayos (flowed), signifying "where blood flowed."

=== Spanish Colonization ===
Balaoan is one of the oldest municipalities of the old Ilocos province, established by Augustinian friars during the 16th century, a time of Spanish expansion in the region. Initially an “encomienda” administered by Christoval Guiral, the settlement encompassed several "rancherias" and catechumens, including areas now part of Namacpacan (Luna), Bangar, Santol, and Sudipen. Historian Adriel Obar Miemban posits that the town's founding occurred in 1587, based on records from early Spanish friars Julian Martin and Salvador Font. Another historian, Alberto Lacsamana, specifically dates its establishment to April 25, 1587. Balaoan was initially referred to as the ministry of Purao, under the administration of the Augustinians, with San Nicolas de Tolentino as its patron saint. The town celebrates his feast day on September 10.

The Spanish civil government of Balaoan was likely established in 1704 under the Spanish Maura Law. The town's name is believed to have been changed to Balaoan in 1739. During this period, Diego Silang, a prominent Ilocano revolutionary—ordered the town's gobernadorcillo to rally the support of the nearby Igorots in his anti-Spanish campaign. The local society was divided into two classes: the babaknang or agtuturay (the principalia, who spoke Castilian), and the cailianes (the commoners, who spoke Ilocano, Kankanaey, Ibaloi, or Pangasinense).

In 1818, the Real Cedula divided the old Ilocos province into Ilocos Norte and Ilocos Sur, with Balaoan, Bangar, and Namacpacan (Luna) becoming the three southernmost towns of Ilocos Sur. On March 2, 1850, the province of La Union was created, and Balaoan, along with its neighboring towns, was incorporated into the new province. Under Spanish governance, the Tribunal Municipal served as the town's governing council, supported by Cabezas de Barangay (barangay heads) and the Juez de Paz (Justice of the Peace), who handled civil and criminal cases. The Cuadrilleros, or rural police, maintained peace and order.

==== The Siete Mártires ====
Balaoan is renowned for being the first northern town of La Union to rise against Spanish colonial rule. A secret society of Insurrectos was organized here, aiming to revolt against Spain. Seven young men: Luciano Resurreccion, Primo Ostrea, Artemio Ostrea, Fernando Ostrea, Patricio Lopez, Rufino Zambrano, and Mariano Peralta were executed for their revolutionary activities and are now collectively remembered as the Siete Mártires. Among them, Fernando Ostrea survived a thigh wound and escaped execution. Pardoned by the authorities, he later became the town's vice president and led subsequent uprisings against Spain and the United States. Balaoan was among the last northern towns where Spanish troops made their final stand in 1898.

=== Philippine Revolution ===
During the Filipino Revolution, Balaoan hosted President Emilio Aguinaldo during his escape to the north on November 20, 1899. Aguinaldo stayed overnight in Balaoan and departed on November 21 for Ilocos Sur. Notably, Aguinaldo narrowly escaped assassination by loyalists of General Antonio Luna from nearby Namacpacan, who sought revenge for Luna's murder.

Balaoan played a significant role in the Filipino-American War. Colonel Aniceto Angeles, a close aide of General Manuel Tinio, led revolutionary forces in the area, conducting battles against American troops between June 29, 1900, and April 3, 1901. One notable victory occurred at Sitio Kalungboyan, where Angeles and his men defeated a company of American soldiers without incurring casualties. However, Angeles was later executed in Bangar, along with two other revolutionaries. Another local figure, Vicente Orfiano, was credited with saving Balaoan's public buildings and many lives during the conflict. Crispulo Patajo's efforts to subdue the revolutionaries ultimately led to the town's pacification and the flight of resistance fighters to Ilocos Sur.

On November 28, 1899, American General Young appointed Don Juan Rodriguez as Municipal President of Balaoan, a position he held until April 1901. Despite the establishment of an American civil government, resistance persisted among the Katipuneros encamped in Balaoan's mountains, maintaining the town's legacy of defiance and resilience throughout its history.

=== American Colonization ===
The town became an American territory after the Spanish-American War in 1898 when the Philippines was ceded to the United States under the Treaty of Paris. Following the Philippine-American War (1899–1902), La Union was reorganized under American colonial administration.

=== Japanese Occupation ===
The Imperial Japanese started its occupation of the town in December 1941 after securing Vigan and Laoag, Colonel Kanno and General Shizuichi Tanaka's detachments advanced south along Route 3. After overcoming Philippine defenses in Bacnotan, they reached San Fernando, La Union, by December 22. The Japanese 14th Army, commanded by Lieutenant General Masaharu Homma, had also landed at Lingayen Gulf, gaining control of key areas in Pangasinan and La Union. This marked the beginning of Japanese occupation in Northern Luzon, including the Lingayen Gulf region, which remained under Japanese control for three years, until it was recaptured by Allied forces in 1945. By September 12, 1945, the town was liberated from Imperial Japan by American and Filipino forces.

== Geography ==
The Municipality of Balaoan is located in the northern part of La Union province. It is bordered by Bacnotan to the south, Bangar to the north, Luna and South China Sea to the west, and Santol to the east.

Barangay Paraoir, located along the South China Sea, is known for its pristine coastal community. Balaoan can be reached from Manila by traveling along the MacArthur Highway or by flying into San Fernando Airport.

Covering a land area of 6,870 hectares (17,000 acres), Balaoan consists primarily of agricultural lands, which make up 4.3% of the total area of La Union province. The town is classified into different land types, with 2,551 hectares designated as lowland, 3,577 hectares as upland, and 322 hectares as the poblacion area. The seashores extend over 7,200 hectares. Balaoan is home to one river Maragayap River, six esteros/creeks, and 50 canals.

The town's existing land use includes 3,755 hectares of agricultural areas, 91.86 hectares of bareland, 710.41 hectares of grassland/shrubland, 202.08 hectares of wetland, 1,508 hectares of forest/wooded areas, and 177.65 hectares of built-up areas.

Balaoan is situated 29.48 kilometres (18.32 mi) from the provincial capital San Fernando, and 295.35 kilometres (183.52 mi) from the country's capital city of Manila.

=== Barangays ===
Politically, Balaoan is divided into 36 barangays, which include 27 lowland barangays, 7 upland barangays, and 2 coastal barangays. Each barangay is further subdivided into puroks, and some also have sitios.

- Almeida
- Antonino
- Apatut
- Ar-arampang
- Baracbac Este
- Baracbac Oeste
- Bet-ang
- Bulbulala
- Bungol
- Butubut Este
- Butubut Norte
- Butubut Oeste
- Butubut Sur
- Cabuaan Oeste
- Calliat
- Calungbuyan
- Camiling
- Dr. Camilo Osias Poblacion
- Guinaburan
- Masupe
- Nagsabaran Norte
- Nagsabaran Sur
- Nalasin
- Napaset
- Pagbennecan
- Pagleddegan
- Pantar Norte
- Pantar Sur
- Pa-o
- Paraoir
- Patpata
- Sablut
- San Pablo
- Sinapangan Norte
- Sinapangan Sur
- Tallipugo

=== Climate ===
Climate data for Balaoan, La Union
Month	Jan	Feb	Mar	Apr	May	Jun	Jul	Aug	Sep	Oct	Nov	Dec	Year
Mean daily maximum °C (°F)	30 (86)	31 (88)	33 (91)	33 (91)	32 (90)	31 (88)	30 (86)	30 (86)	30 (86)	31 (88)	31 (88)	31 (88)	31 (88)
Mean daily minimum °C (°F)	21 (70)	22 (72)	23 (73)	25 (77)	26 (79)	26 (79)	26 (79)	25 (77)	25 (77)	24 (75)	23 (73)	22 (72)	24 (75)
Average precipitation mm (inches)	42 (1.7)	48 (1.9)	74 (2.9)	110 (4.3)	269 (10.6)	275 (10.8)	362 (14.3)	325 (12.8)	330 (13.0)	306 (12.0)	126 (5.0)	61 (2.4)	2,328 (91.7)
Average rainy days	11.2	12.0	17.1	21.2	27.1	26.8	28.1	27.0	26.0	24.5	17.7	12.4	251.1
Source: Meteoblue

== Demographics ==
In the 2020 census, the population of Balaoan was 40,339 people, with a density of 590 inhabitants per square kilometre or 1,500 inhabitants per square mile.

Population census of Balaoan
Year	Pop.	±% p.a.
1903	10,008	—
1918	11,276	+0.80%
1939	12,773	+0.60%
1948	14,274	+1.24%
1960	17,401	+1.66%
1970	22,331	+2.52%
1975	24,381	+1.78%
1980	25,197	+0.66%
1990	30,042	+1.77%
1995	31,420	+0.84%
2000	33,786	+1.57%
2007	36,829	+1.20%
2010	37,910	+1.06%
2015	39,188	+0.63%
2020	40,339	+0.61%
2024	40,440	+0.06%
Source: Philippine Statistics Authority

=== Language ===
The dominant language spoken in Balaoan is Ilocano.

== Economy ==
Balaoan is a first class municipality and its economy is primarily based on agriculture, particularly farming and fishing. Rice is the main agricultural product, with the municipality being more than sufficient in its production. The first Rice Processing Center in La Union is located in Barangay Bet-ang. In addition to rice, Balaoan is known for producing high-quality Virginia tobacco, which is harvested from January to April.

The town also produces a variety of fruits and vegetables, which are cultivated both on farms and in backyards. Livestock, poultry, and marine products provide significant sources of income for local farmers and fishermen. Balaoan is particularly renowned for its sea urchin production in Barangays Paraoir and Almeida, which is the town's One Town, One Product (OTOP), as well as its seaweed farming.

Barangay Ar-arampang is the primary producer of handicrafts in Balaoan, providing a source of income for the unemployed in the area.

According to the 2016 Socioeconomic report of the town, the following data highlights the agricultural productivity:

- Palay/Rice: 2,421 hectares, 686.5 tons, 152% sufficiency level
- Corn: 15 hectares, 60 tons, -316% sufficiency level
- Fruits and vegetables: 193.9 hectares, 3,878 tons, 318% sufficiency level
- Leafy vegetables: 12 hectares, 120 tons, 74% sufficiency level
- Fruits: 25.5 hectares, 933.5 tons, 165% sufficiency level
- Legumes: 44 hectares, 88 tons, 215% sufficiency level
- Root crops: 13.1 hectares, 183.4 tons, 163% sufficiency level
- Fish (inland and capture): 11.2 hectares, 10.8 tons, 9.5 tons, -22% sufficiency level

The town's agricultural outputs demonstrate a strong local economy driven by diverse farming and fishing industries.

Poverty incidence of Balaoan (%)

Source: Philippine Statistics Authority

== Festivities ==
Balaoan celebrates its Parochial Fiesta (Saint Nicholas of Tolentino Parish Church) every September 9 and 10, and the Panagyaman Festival from December 18 to 22. The Panagyaman Festival is a celebration of gratitude for the bountiful agricultural harvest and all of God's blessings bestowed upon the townspeople. The festival is highlighted by street dancing, the Mutya ng Balaoan and Little Miss Balaoan beauty contests, People's Night (Rabii Daguiti Umili), an Awards Night, and other activities. These four days of festivities are a celebration for all Balaoñios.

== Government ==
=== Local government ===
Balaoan, belonging to the first congressional district of the province of La Union, is governed by a mayor designated as its local chief executive and by a municipal council as its legislative body in accordance with the Local Government Code. The mayor, vice mayor, and the councilors are elected directly by the people through an election which is being held every three years.

=== Elected officials ===
Members of the Municipal Council (2019–2022)
Position	Name
Congressman	Francisco Paolo P. Ortega V
Mayor	Carlo Castor U. Concepcion
Vice-Mayor	Aleli U. Concepcion
Councilors	Danny Concepcion
Councilors	Celia Detran
Councilors	Cesar Ostrea
Councilors	Rogelio Concepcion
Councilors	Teddy Marron
Councilors	Larry Olivar
Councilors	Rosie Is-Isa
Councilors	Ramon Ordinario

== Education ==
The Balaoan Schools District Office governs all educational institutions within the municipality. It oversees the management and operations of all private and public elementary and high schools.

=== Primary and elementary Schools ===
- Almeida Elementary School
- Apatut Elementary School (Apatut)
- Ar-arampang Elementary School (Ar- Arampang, Balaoan)
- Balaoan Central School (Antonino and Cabua-an)
- Balaoan Christian Foundation (Nalasin)
- Bulbulala Elementary School (Bulbulala)
- Bungol Elementary School (Bungol)
- Butubut Elementary School (Butubut Sur)
- Butubut Norte Elementary School (Butubut Norte)
- Calliat Elementary School (Calliat)
- Guinaburan Elementary School (Guinaburan)
- Masupe Elementary School (Masupe)
- Nagsabaran Sur Elementary School (Nsgsabaran Sur)
- Osias Educational Foundation (Dr. Camilo Osias)
- Pantar Norte Elementary School (Pantar Norte)
- Pantar Sur Elementary School (Pantar Sur)
- Paraoir Elementary School (Paraoir)
- Patpata Elementary School (Patpata)
- San Nicolas Academy (Dr. Camilo Osias, Nalasin and Antonino)
- Sinapangan Norte Elementary School (Sinapangan Norte)
- Sinapangan Sur Elementary School (Tal-lipugo)

=== Secondary Schools ===
- Bungol National High School (Bungol)
- Butubut National High School (Butubut Norte)
- Castor Z. Concepcion Memorial National High School (Nalasin and Antonino)
- Osias Educational Foundation (Dr. Camilo Osias)
- Paraoir National High School
- San Nicolas Academy
- Sinapangan National High School (Tal-lipugo)

== Notable personalities ==
- Camilo Osías, former Senator
- Magnolia Antonino, former Senator

== Gallery ==
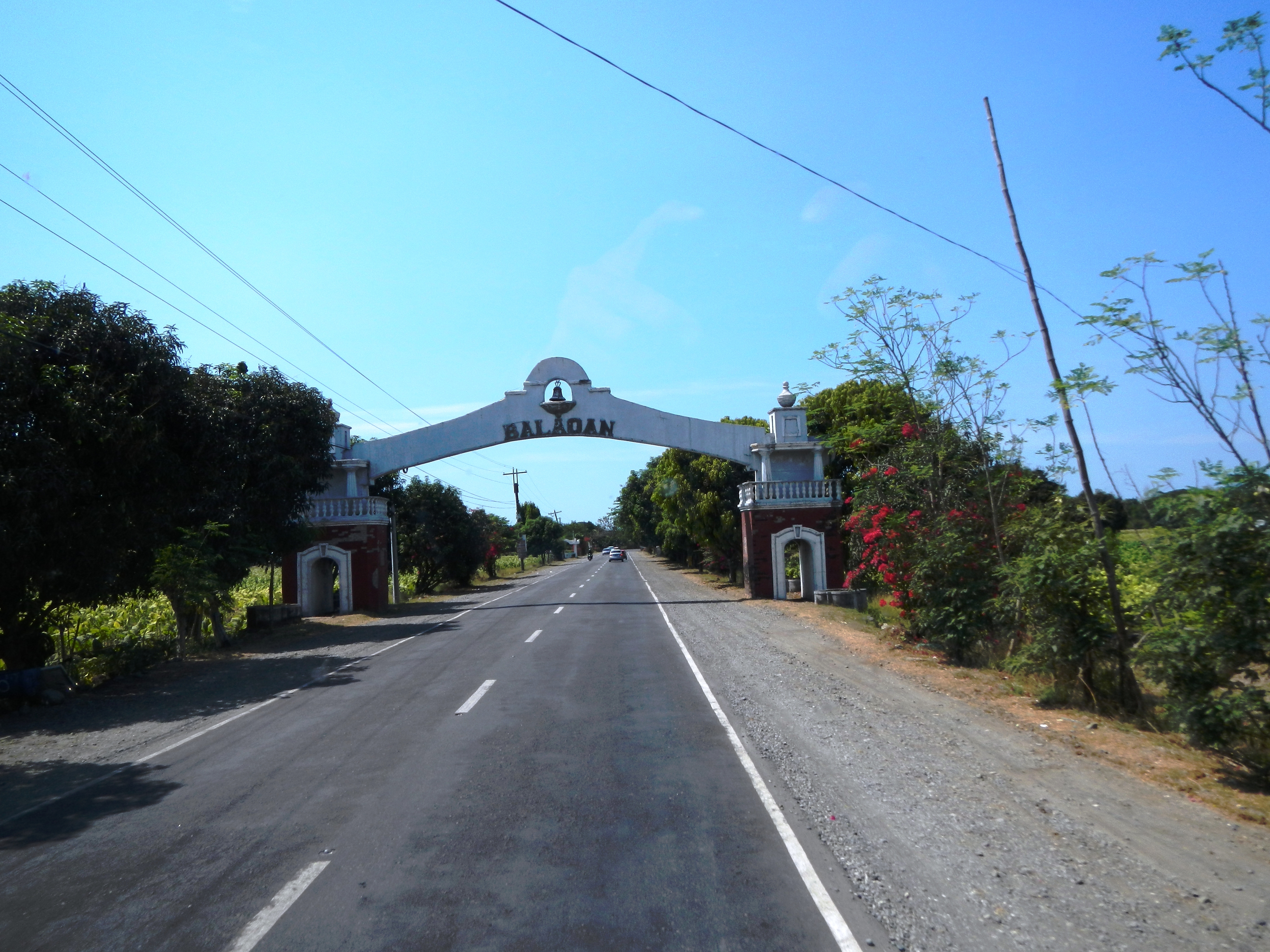
Welcome arch

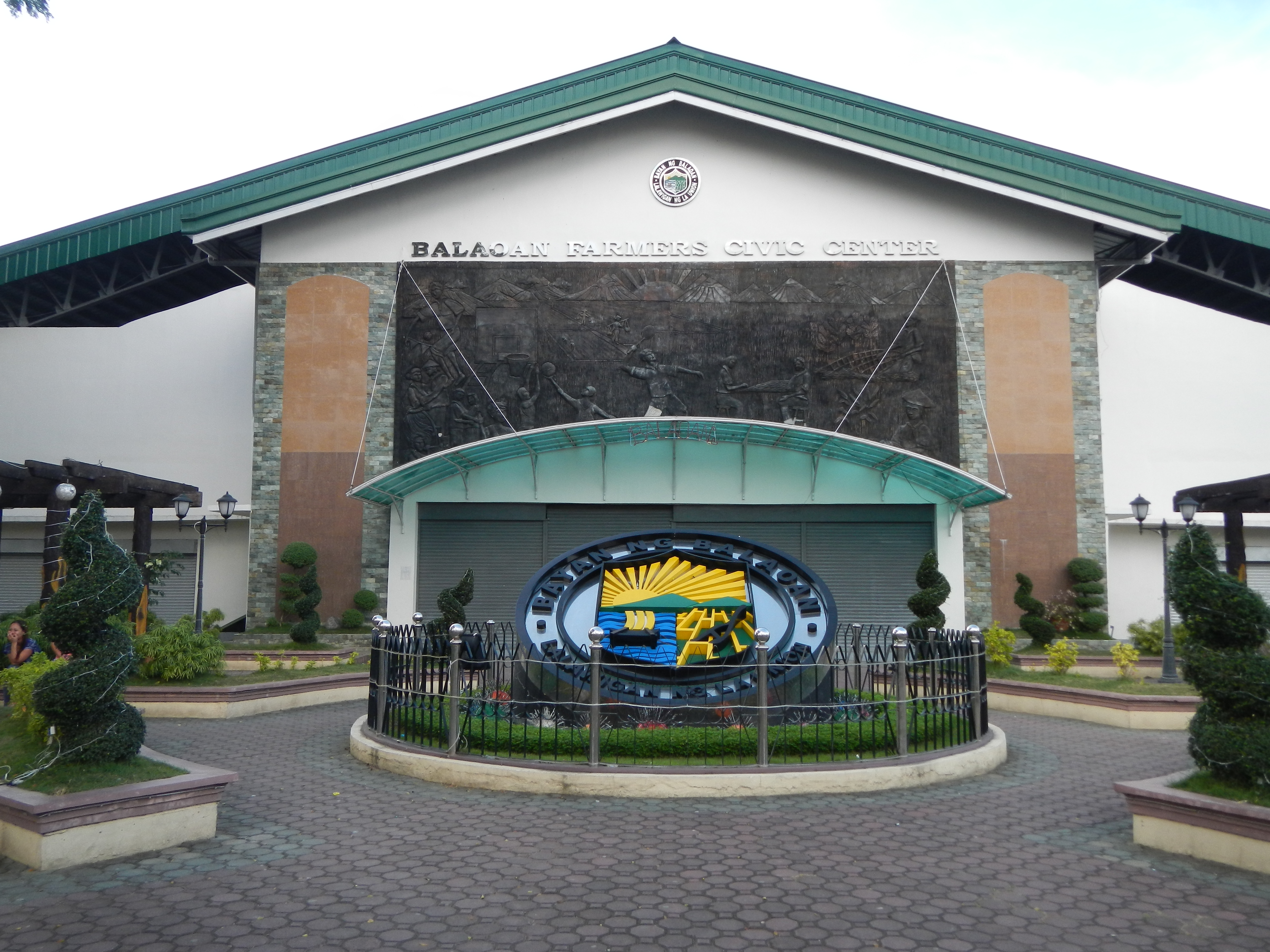
Municipal hall

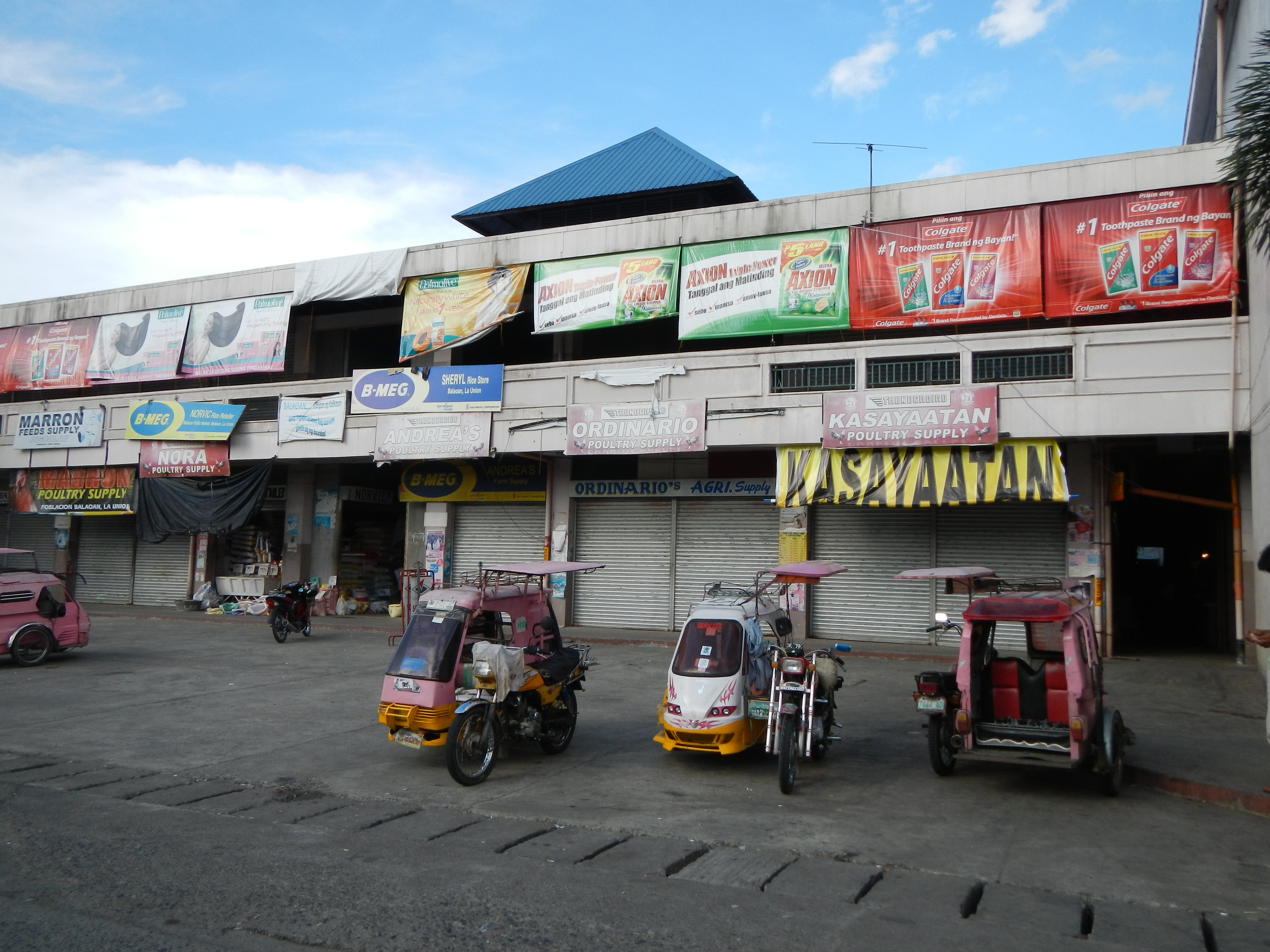
Public market

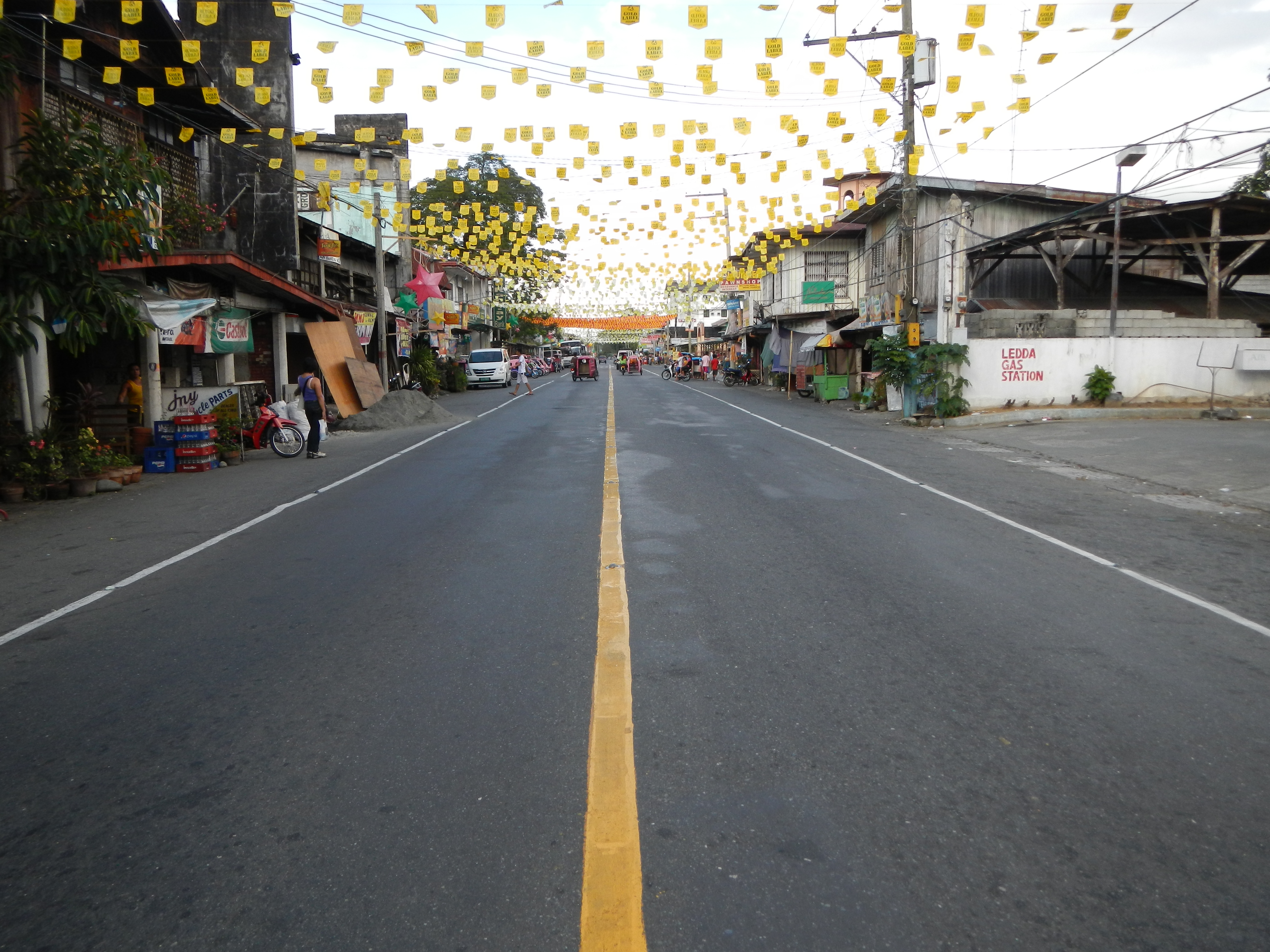
Street view

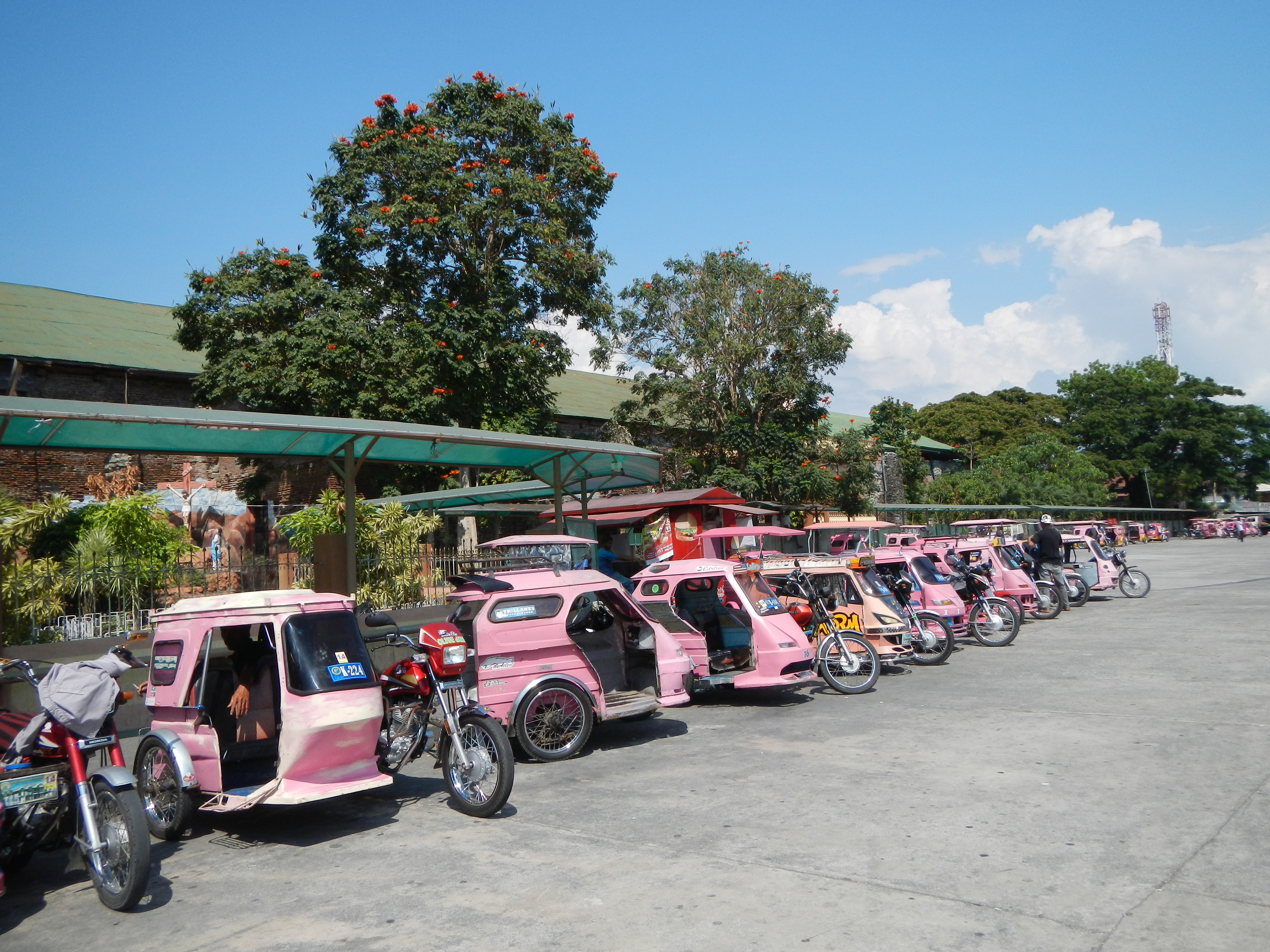
Tricycle terminal

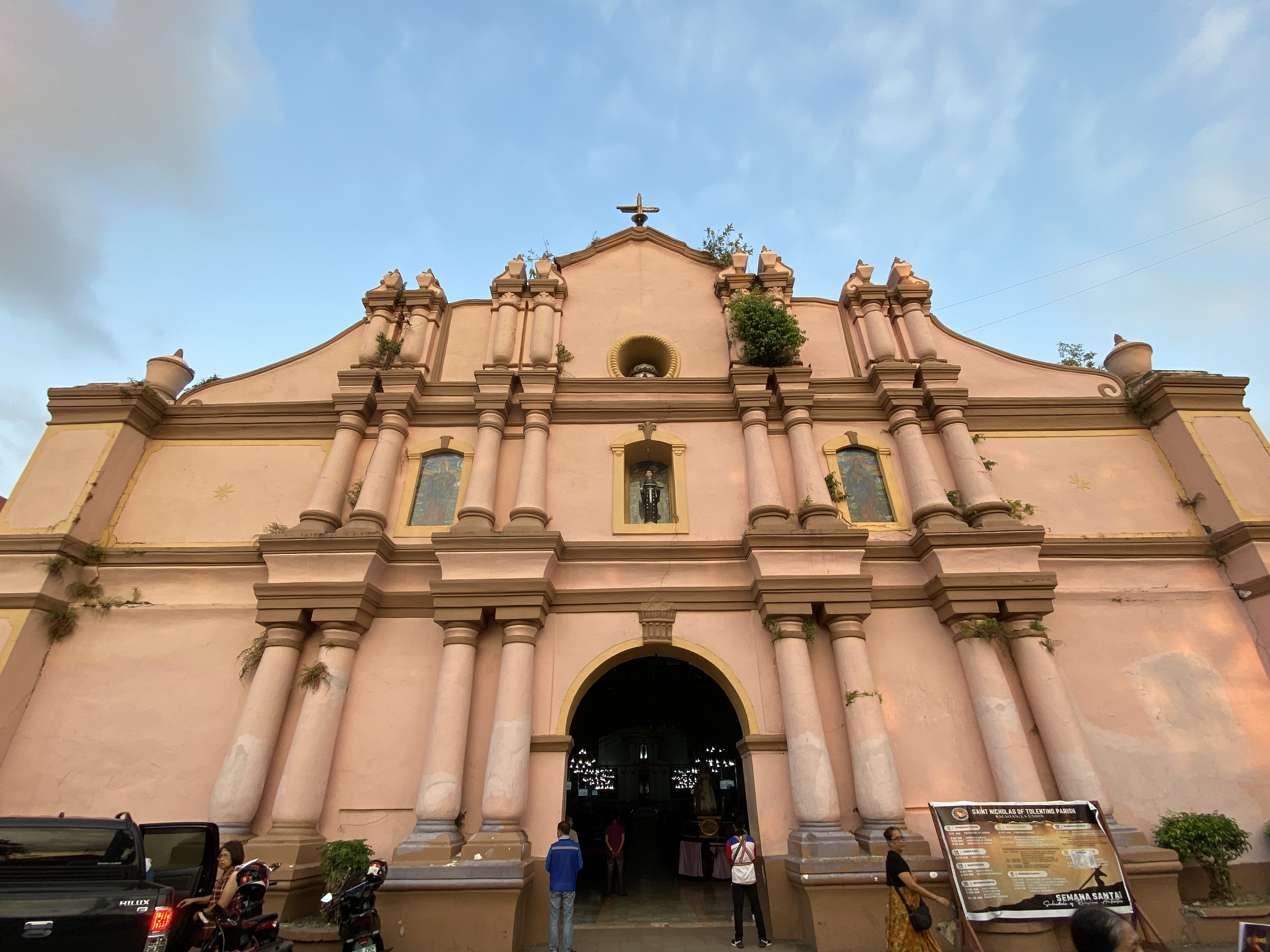
St. Nicholas of Tolentino Parish Church
