= Bacnotan Church =

Roman Catholic church in La Union, Philippines

- Saint Michael the Archangel Parish Church
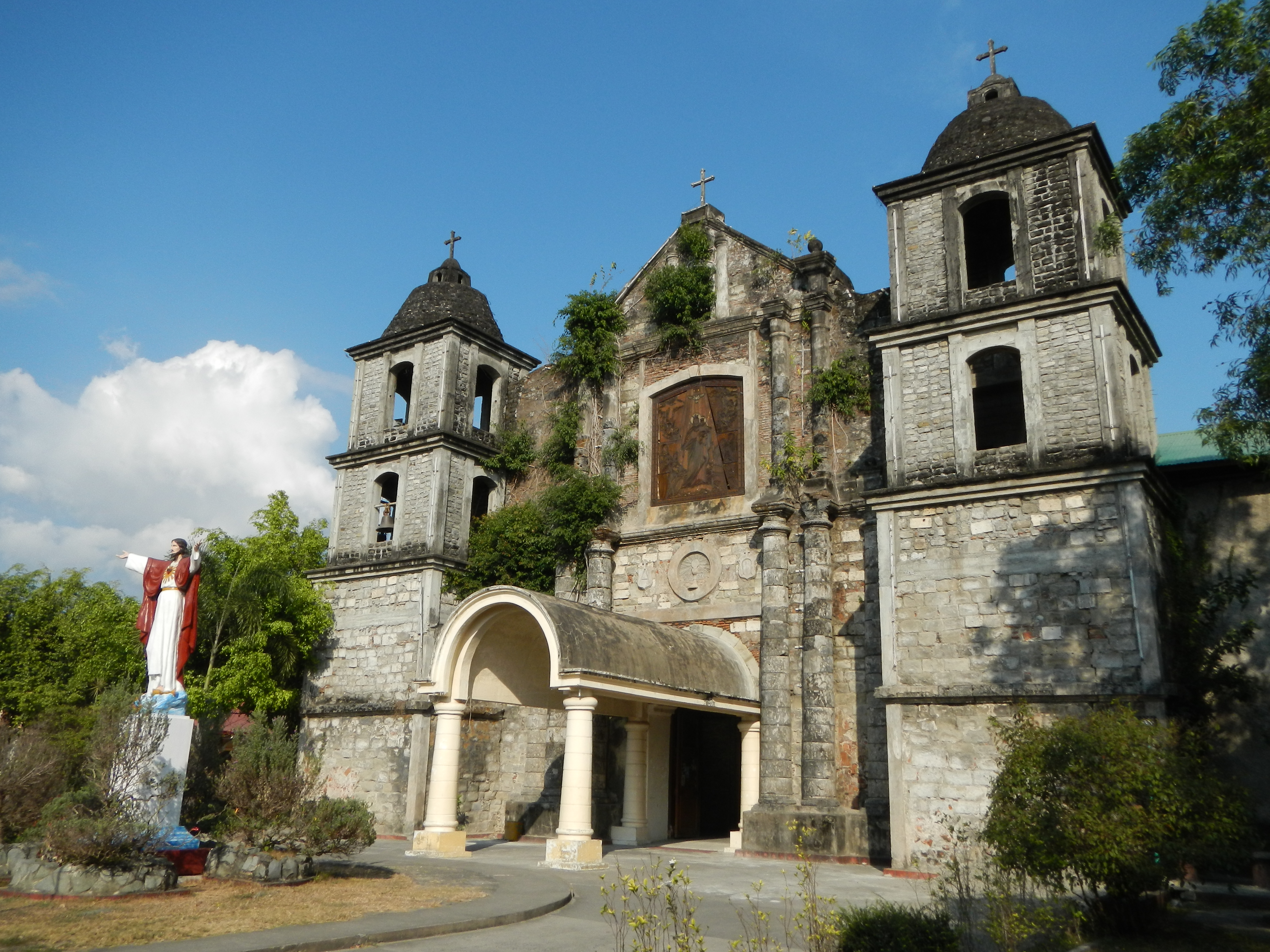
- Church facade in 2014

- Location in Luzon Location in the Philippines
- 16°43′11″N 120°21′12″E
- Location: Poblacion, Bacnotan, La Union
- Country: Philippines
- Denomination: Roman Catholic

History
- Status: Parish church
- Dedication: Saint Michael the Archangel

Architecture
- Functional status: Active
- Architectural type: Church building
- Groundbreaking: 1817
- Completed: 1819

Administration
- Archdiocese: Lingayen-Dagupan
- Diocese: San Fernando de La Union

Clergy
- Archbishop: Socrates B. Villegas
- Bishop: Daniel O. Presto

Saint Michael the Archangel Parish Church, commonly known as Bacnotan Church, is a Roman Catholic church located in Bacnotan, La Union, Philippines. Dedicated to Saint Michael the Archangel, it is under the jurisdiction of the Diocese of San Fernando de La Union.

== History ==
The town of Bacnotan (also formerly known as Vagnotan or Bagnotan) is said to have been founded in 1583. It was annexed as a visita of Baratao, now San Juan on December 29, 1598. In 1599, the convent of Bacnotan was asked to pay annual rent to the Augustinian Monastery in Manila. Father Juan de Rojas became prior of Bacnotan on May 4, 1599. He was appointed without voting powers to the provincial council. In 1606, Bacnotan became a visita of an unnamed town, and later as a visita of Alingayen, now Lingayen. In 1607, a priest from Lingayen was assigned to Bacnotan. In 1686, Bacnotan was separated from Bauang with Father Ignacio de Barrenechea as vicar-prior. Bacnotan was supervised by the Dominicans from 1771 to 1790 on the orders of Bishop Miguel Garcia.

The first or second church of Bacnotan was built under the supervision of Father Juan Zugasti; it was completed from 1817 to 1819. The church was destroyed by an earthquake in 1860. The church was later restored by Father Saturnino Pinto and was completed by Father Bernardo Gonzalez with an adjoining convent made of stone and wood in 1887.

== Architecture ==
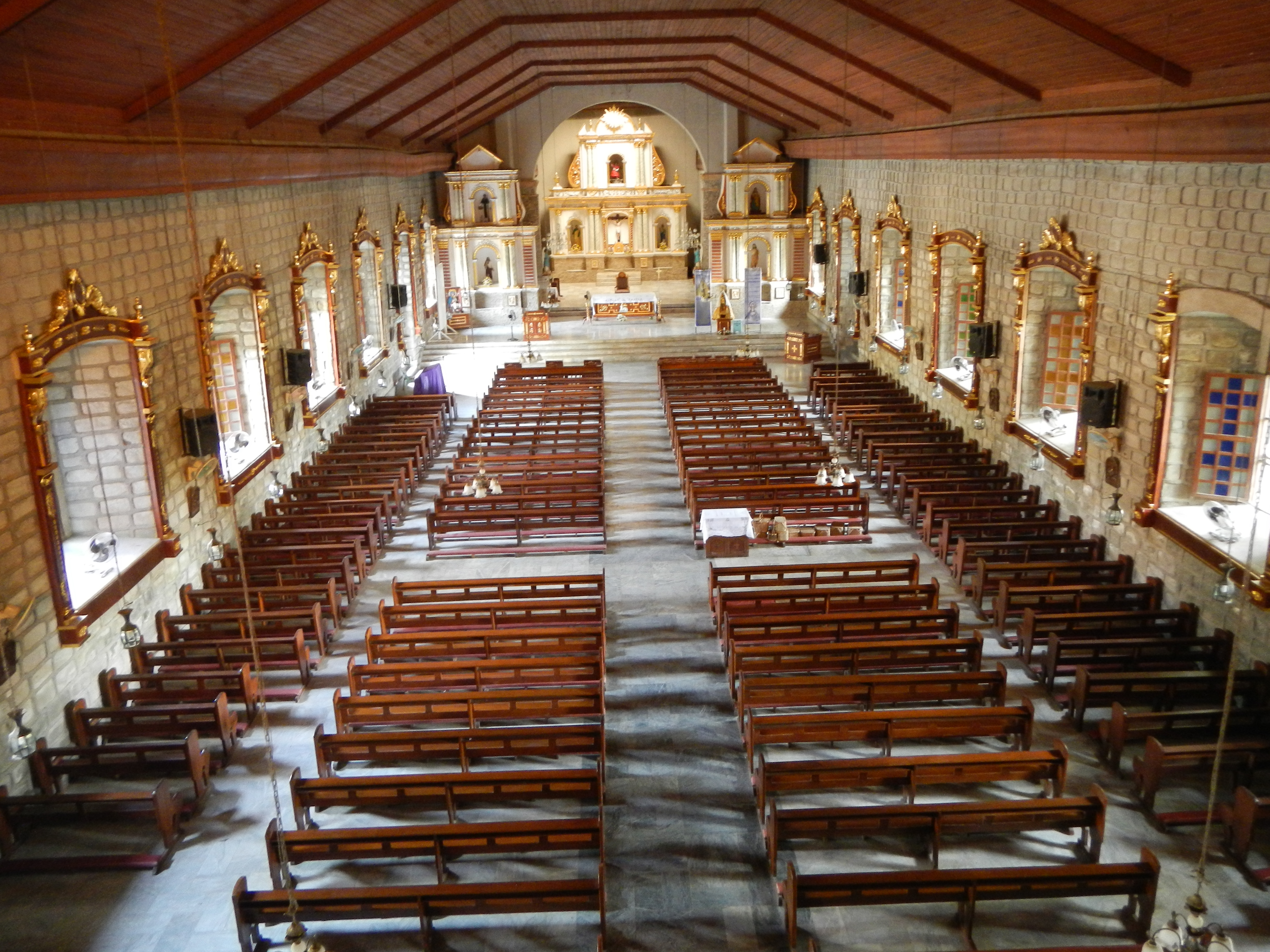
Church interior in 2014

The church's facade is a mix of baroque and neoclassical style. It has a massive bell tower on its facade along with overcrowded columns, and rectangular and vertical movements reminiscent of neoclassical style. The church is made of rectangular blocks placed on top of another. An old bell with a November 20, 1874, inscription can be found on the church ground.

== Bibliography ==
- Dela Torre, Visitacion (2006). The Ilocos Heritage. Makati: Tower Book House. ISBN 978-971-91030-9-7.
