= San Juan, La Union =

Municipality in La Union, Philippines

San Juan
- Municipality
- Municipality of San Juan
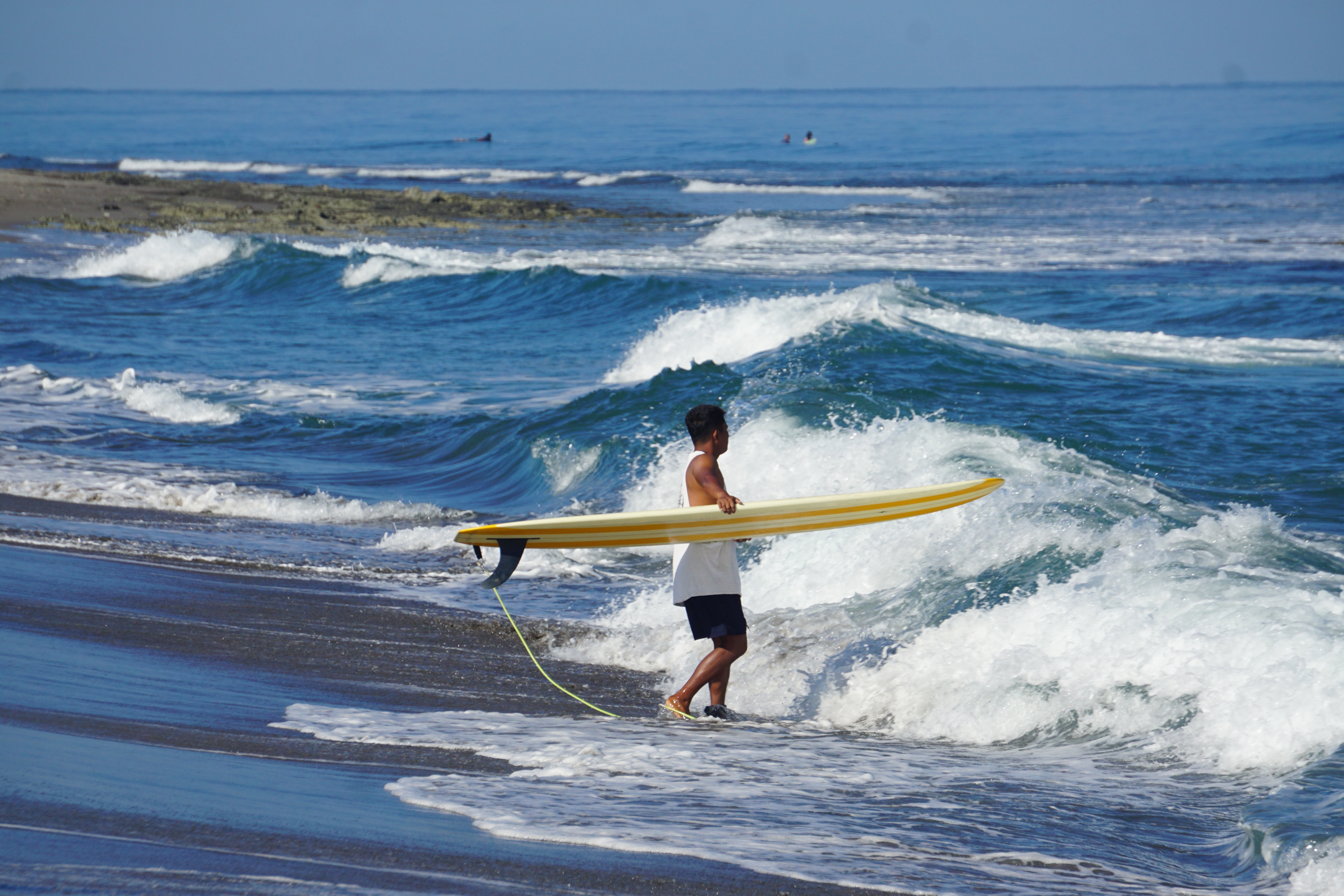
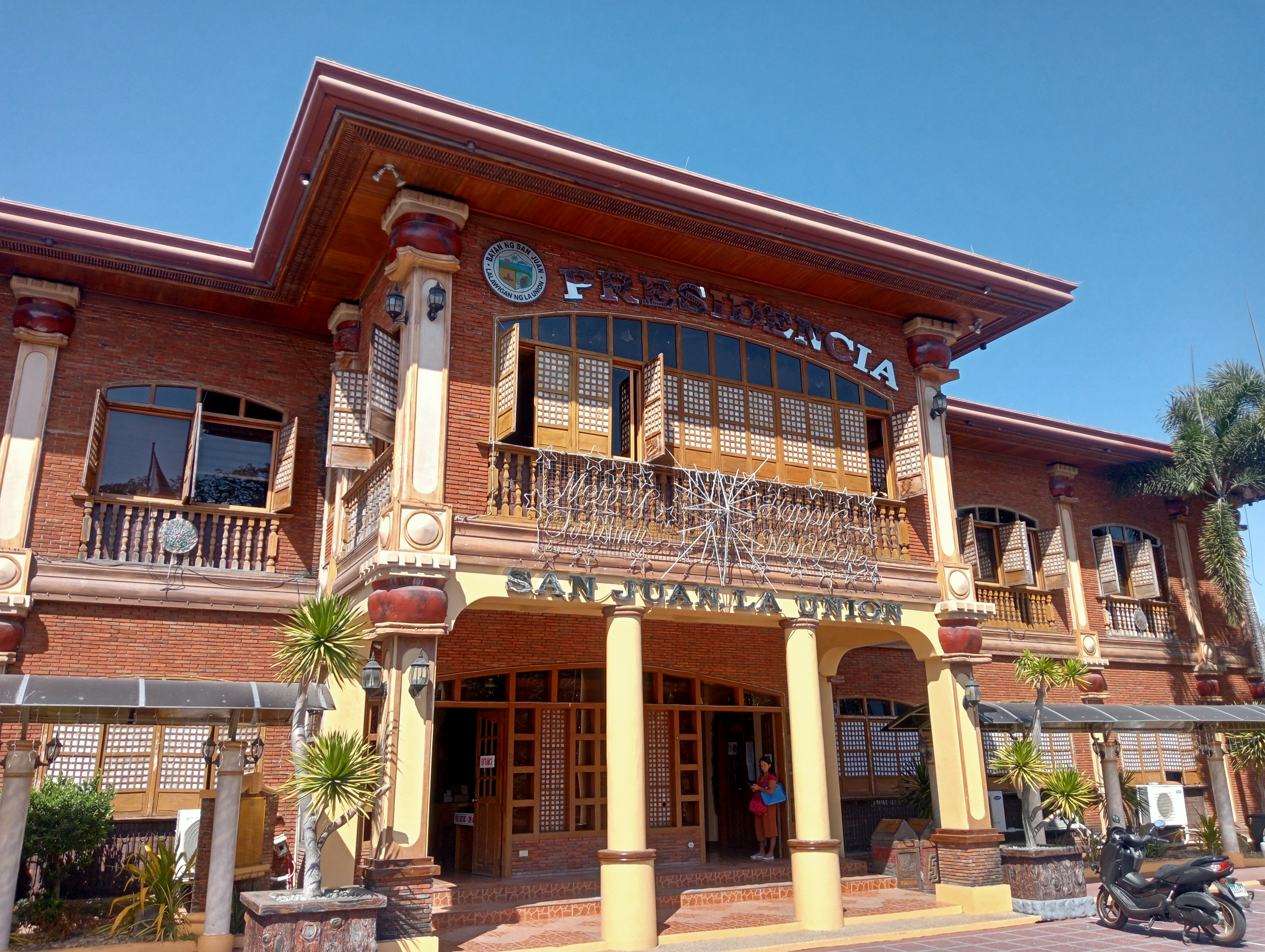
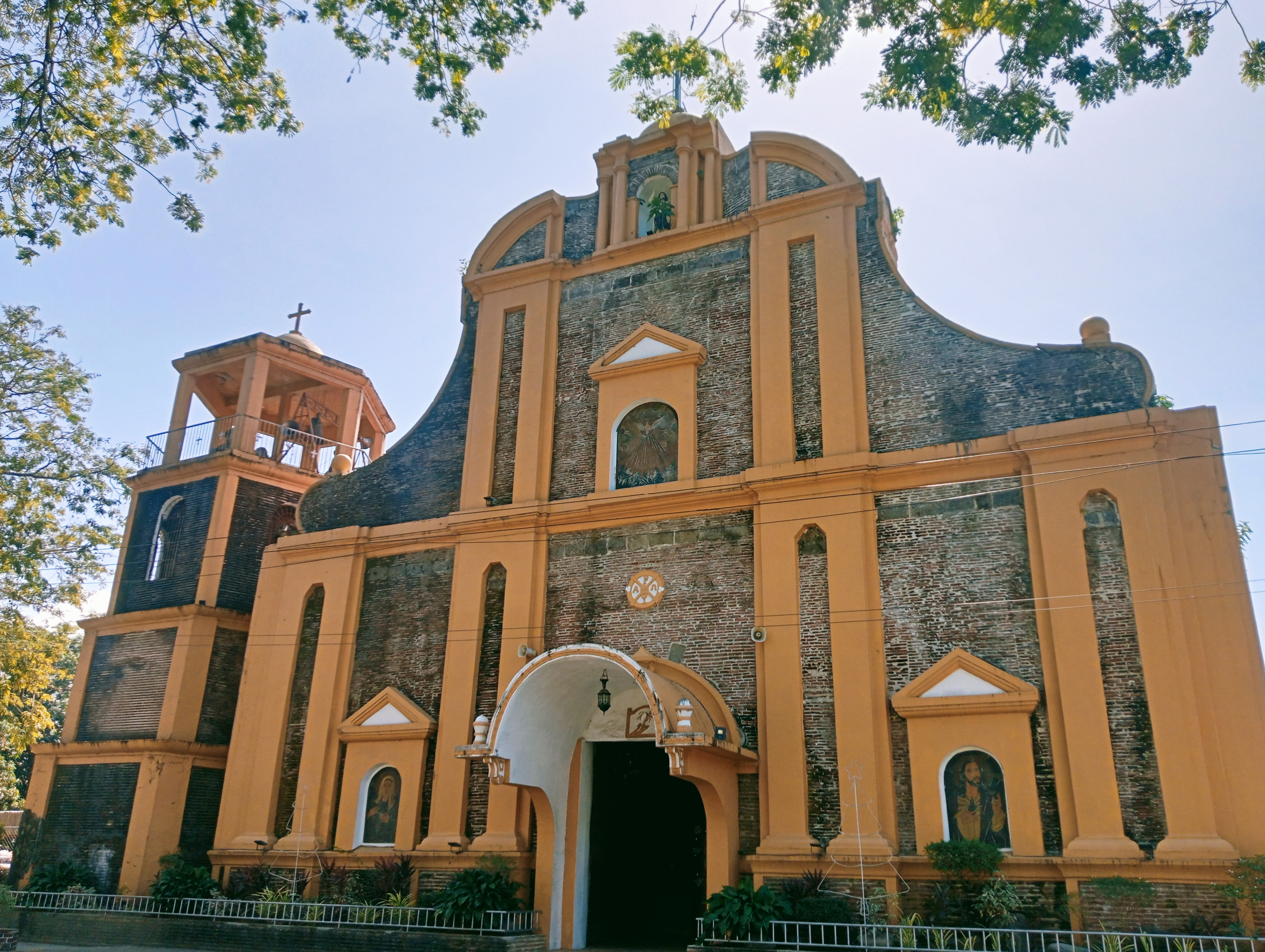
- San Juan Surftown, Municipal Hall & St. John the Baptist Parish Church

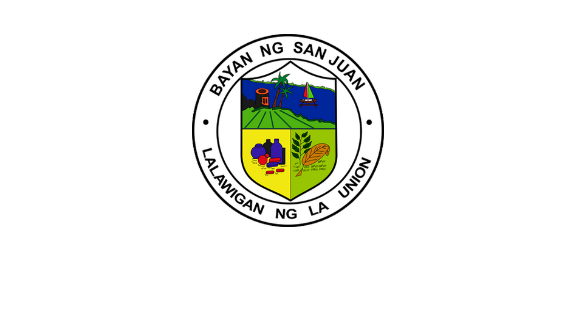
- Flag Seal
- Nickname: Surfing Capital of the North
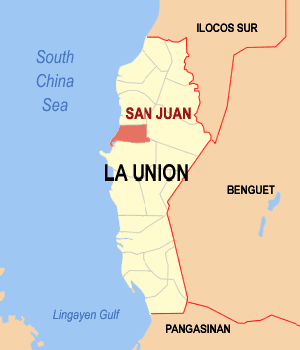
- Map of La Union with San Juan highlighted
- Interactive map of San Juan
- Location within the Philippines
- Coordinates: 16°40′N 120°20′E
- Country: Philippines
- Region: Ilocos Region
- Province: La Union
- District: 1st district
- Named for: St. John the Baptist
- Barangays: 41 (see Barangays)

Government
  - Type: Sangguniang Bayan
  - Mayor: Mariquita P. Ortega
  - Vice Mayor: Arturo P. Valdriz
  - Representative: Francisco Paolo P. Ortega V
  - Municipal Council: Members: Mitos Magsaysay; Kyle F. Carpio; Arnel Peralta; Louie Fontanilla; Norma B. Lim; Athena Lopez Nang; Eusebio Lim; Aldrick G. Carillo
  - Electorate: 27,857 voters (2025)

Area
  - Total: 57.12 km^{2} (22.05 sq mi)
- Elevation: 25 m (82 ft)
- Highest elevation: 312 m (1,024 ft)
- Lowest elevation: 0 m (0 ft)

Population (2024 census)
  - Total: 41,319
  - Density: 723.4/km^{2} (1,874/sq mi)
  - Households: 10,080

Economy
  - Income class: 1st municipal income class
  - Poverty incidence: 6.94% (2023)
  - Revenue: ₱ 360.5 million (2024)
  - Assets: ₱ 1,175 million (2024)
  - Expenditure: ₱ 278.4 million (2024)
  - Liabilities: ₱ 120.1 million (2024)

Service provider
  - Electricity: La Union Electric Cooperative (LUELCO)
- Time zone: UTC+8 (PST)
- ZIP code: 2514
- PSGC: 0103316000
- IDD : area code: +63 (0)72
- Native languages: Ilocano; Tagalog
- Website: www.sanjuanlaunion.gov.ph

San Juan, officially the Municipality of San Juan (Ilocano: Ili ti San Juan; Filipino: Bayan ng San Juan), is a coastal municipality in the province of La Union, Philippines. According to the 2024 census, it has a population of 41,319 people.

It is known as the Surfing Capital of the North.

== Etymology ==
The name San Juan is derived from the Spanish name Saint John the Baptist (San Juan Bautista), a revered figure in Christianity recognized as the forerunner of Jesus Christ. The town was named in his honor in 1586 by Augustinian friars during the Spanish colonization, following the tradition of dedicating settlements to Christian saints. Saint John the Baptist's significant role in biblical history particularly his call for repentance and his baptism of Jesus in the Jordan River made him an ideal patron for the municipality. The adoption of his name reflects the profound influence of Spanish Catholicism on the cultural and historical identity of the area.

== History ==
=== Early history ===
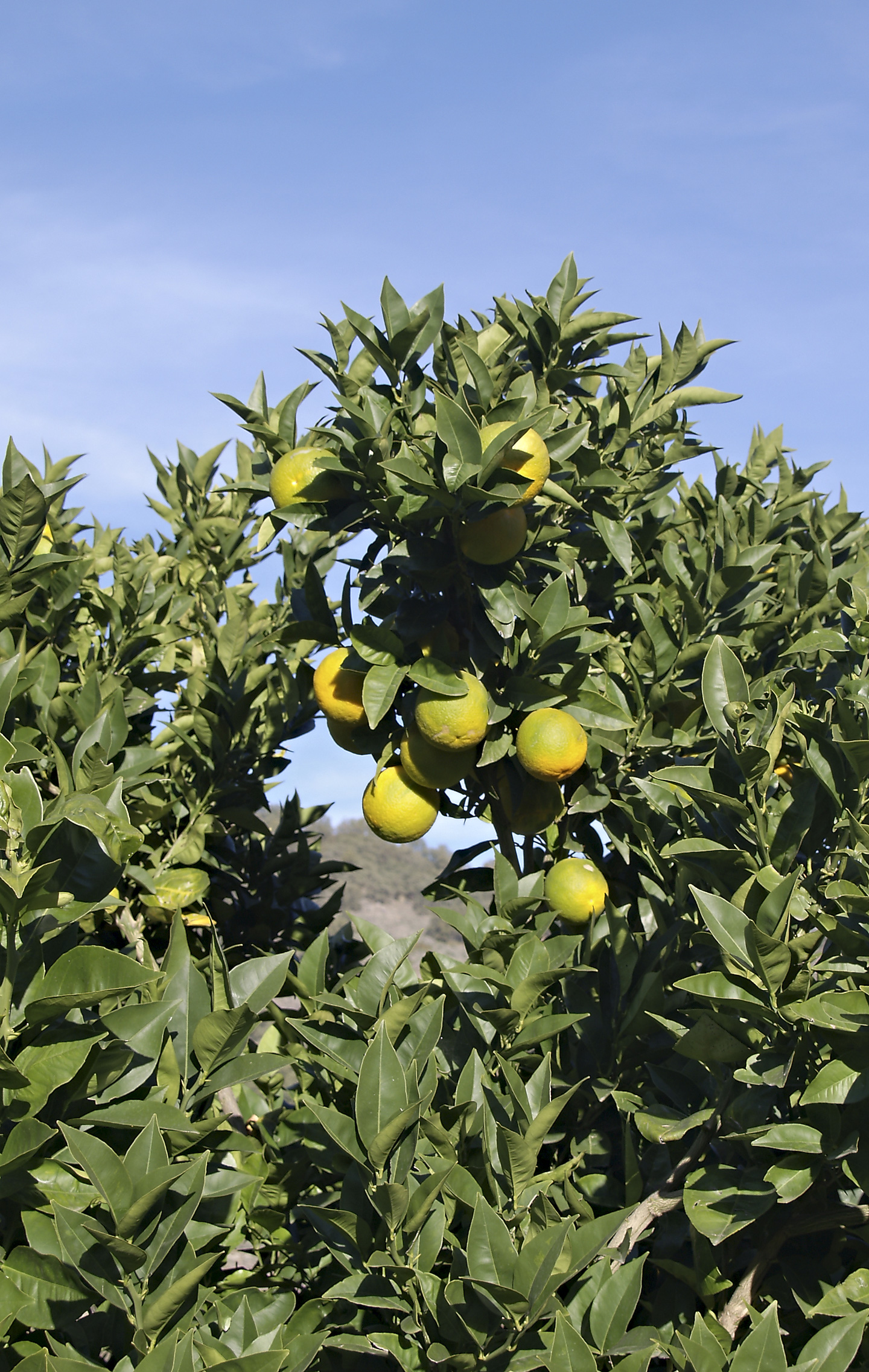
Dalandan tree fruits and leaves

San Juan was originally a settlement of the Ilocano group called Samtoy and was known as Dalandan, named after the native fruit (Citrus × aurantium L.) that grew abundantly in the area. The people in this settlement practiced animistic religion and were actively engaged in trading goods with neighboring areas, including the Igorots from the highlands, Pangasinans, Tagalogs, and even traders from Maritime Southeast Asian countries, China, and Japan. According to historian William Henry Scott, goods such as gold, beeswax, ceramics, porcelain, beads, and metals were exchanged in this trade network.

=== Spanish colonial era ===
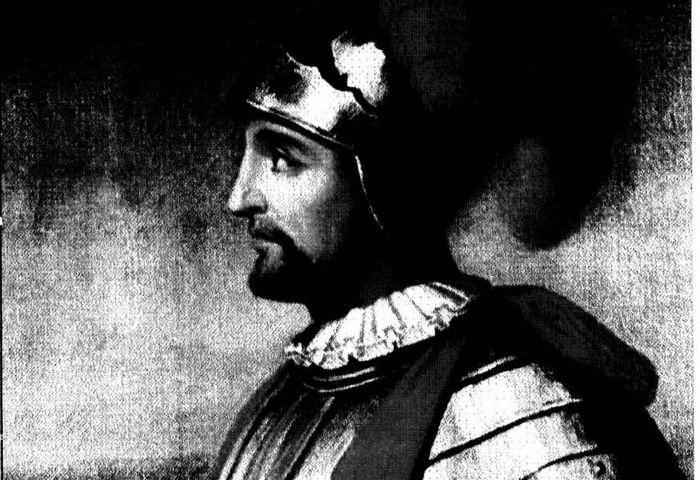
Spanish conquistador Juan de Salcedo

In 1572, Spanish conquistador Juan de Salcedo arrived in the area as part of his mission to pacify the northern regions following the Spanish conquest of Manila. His expedition landed in a nearby settlement, now San Fernando, and eventually reached the settlement of Dalandan, which was abundant in native citrus trees. Salcedo attempted to persuade the natives to pay tribute to Spain but did not remain in the area. He continued his journey northward until he reached Vigan, which he founded as "Villa Fernandina de Vigan" in honor of Prince Ferdinand, the son of King Philip II, who had died at the age of four.

In 1582, the area of San Juan was proclaimed a mission station under the authority of the Augustinian Order and was initially named Baratao, as recorded in the Nueva Segovia Bi-centennial souvenir booklet dated April 25, 1587. By 1586, the town had become the center of the parish and was renamed San Juan by the Augustinian friars in honor of the Catholic Patron Saint John the Baptist (San Juan Bautista). During this time, the settlement had an Augustinian convent, a population of 6,000, and Friar Agustin Niño served as its first priest.

The settlement of San Juan, originally called Baratao or Baltao, was composed of several settlements - Bauang, Mapatnag, Allangigan, Dayawan (now part of Bauang), San Miguel de Bacnotan (now part of Bacnotan), San Juan Bautista de Baltao, San Guillermo de Dalangdang, San Vicente de Balanac (now part of San Fernando), and a settlement called Bona or Boa. The center of the Ministerio was located at San Juan Bautista de Baltao, now known as San Juan.

In 1587, town became the center of an encomienda owned by one Captain Bernardo Sandi. Around this time, Father Agustin Niño transferred the Ministerio to Bauang, and San Juan became an alternate visita (a settlement without a parish priest) for Bauang and Bacnotan. By 1707, the Church of St. John the Baptist was constructed in San Juan.

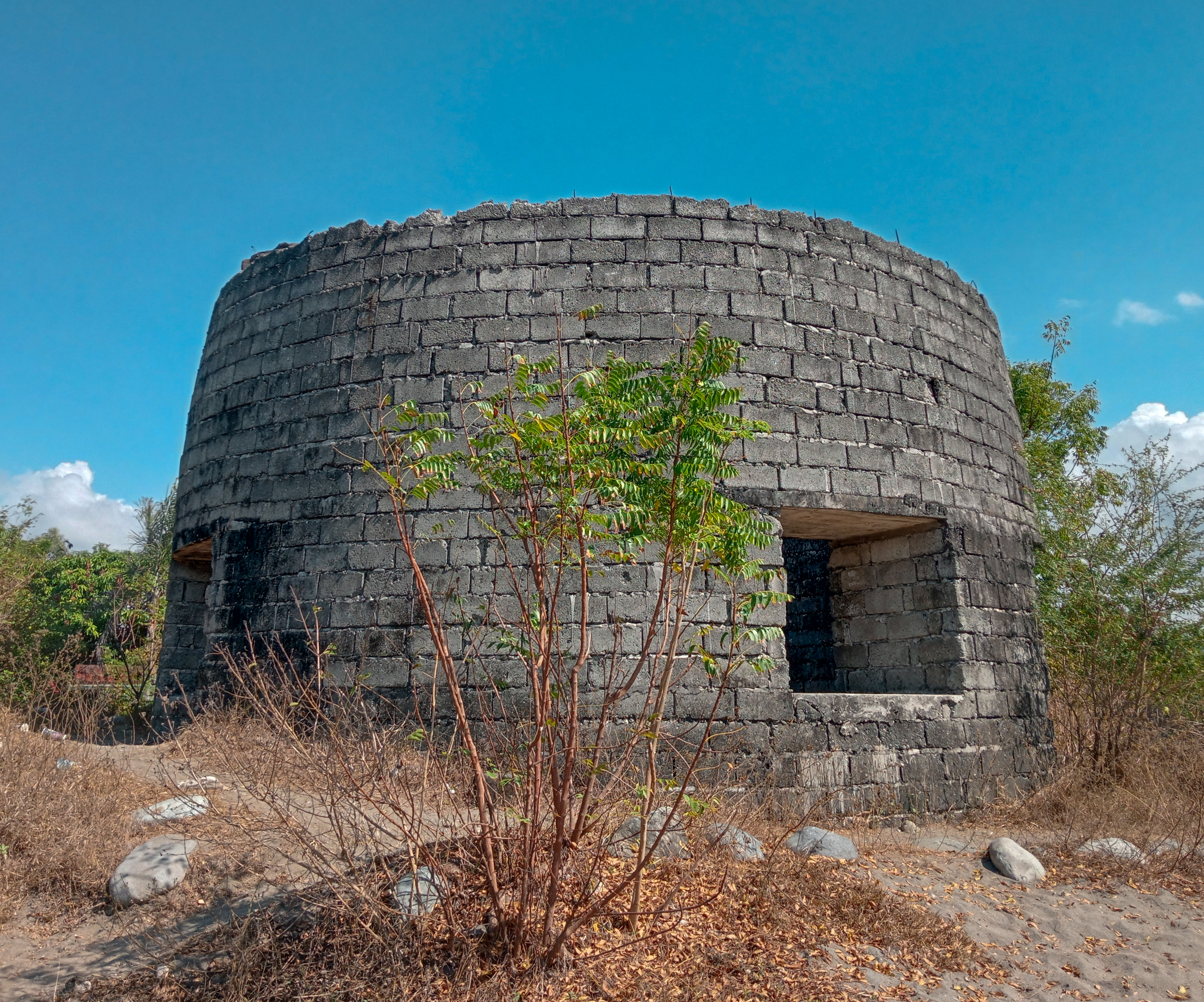
San Juan Watchtower

During these years, coastal settlements, especially during summer or when the sea was calm, were frequently raided by Tirongs and Moro pirates. These raids resulted in the abduction of women and children and widespread destruction. In response, watchtowers were constructed to protect the people from future threats.

By 1772, the mission station of San Juan was placed under the authority of the Dominican Order. Jose de los Angeles became the first Captain Municipal of San Juan in 1782. In 1807, San Juan was officially established as a parish, with a permanent parish priest being assigned. On March 2, 1850, San Juan became part of the province of La Union, which was created by Governor-General Antonio Maria Blanco.

During the Philippine Revolution of 1896, a great fire razed the entire town of San Juan, destroying the church, convent, rectory, and church registers. Despite this, records from 1898 to 1917 survived and were later microfilmed. After the Spanish–American War, Reverend Mariano Gaerlan, a native of San Juan, became the first Filipino parish priest of the town. He oversaw the reconstruction of the church, which had been destroyed during the revolution. His successor, Reverend Eustaquio Ocampo, continued the church's construction until its completion. During this period, San Juan temporarily ceased to be a parish, and its spiritual needs were managed by the parish priest from San Fernando.

In 1918, San Juan regained its status as a parish, and municipal birth registers began being maintained starting in 1922.

=== American invasion era ===
After the Spanish–American War, Father Mariano Gaerlan was appointed priest. He was a native of San Juan, the first Filipino priest for the town, and one of the "Nine Clerics" of Nueva Segovia who fought in the revolution. He also began the reconstruction of the church in 1902, which was completed under his successor, Father Eustaquio Ocampo.

Another local resident, also named Mariano Gaerlan, wrote Biag ti Maysa a Lakay, Wenno Nakaam-ames a Bales (i.e., Life of an Old Man, or a Dreadful Revenge) under the pen-name of Batallador. The book was in the local Ilokano language and published in 1909. He was originally from Candon, Ilocos Sur where he also maintained a residence and an aspiring politician who was never elected to public office. He had several children including Nieves Gaerlan who married Antonio "Matias" Aquino, a then Mayor of San Juan, and "Captain" Candonino Gaerlan, a guerrilla leader, and Filipino war hero.

=== Japanese occupation era ===
From 1941 to 1945 San Juan was occupied by the invading Japanese forces during World War II.

On January 19, 1942, Gaerlan co-led the first guerrilla ambush against Japanese forces in the Philippines, which was prosecuted on the southern outskirts of Candon. He was subsequently appointed commander of the Third Battalion of the 121st Infantry Regiment of the United States Armed Forces in the Philippines – Northern Luzon (USAFIP-NL). This regiment is often referred to as the La Union Infantry Regiment and was commanded by "Captain" George M. Barnett. Gaerlan was killed and subsequently beheaded later that same year at San Juan after he was betrayed by the local chief of police while visiting his sister. His head was stuffed into a jar of alcohol and displayed in the plazas of the towns en route to Candon. There the town mayor convinced the Japanese that this was in poor taste, and the container was thrown into a rice paddy west of the town.

As the war progressed, crops and local services were destroyed. Food was in short supply.

San Juan was liberated in 1945 by the soldiers of the 121st Infantry Regiment, Philippine Commonwealth Army, USAFIP-NL and guerrillas of the La Union Infantry Regiment during the Battle of San Fernando under Major Russell W. Volckmann on their way to meet the liberating forces of General Douglas MacArthur on the beaches of Lingayen Gulf.

=== Philippine independence ===
After the war, inflation led to the financial crisis of 1950 which was followed by the introduction of import controls. Subsequent government-sponsored irrigation systems and farm technicians led to a slow but assured recovery with increased productivity and profitability.

== Geography ==
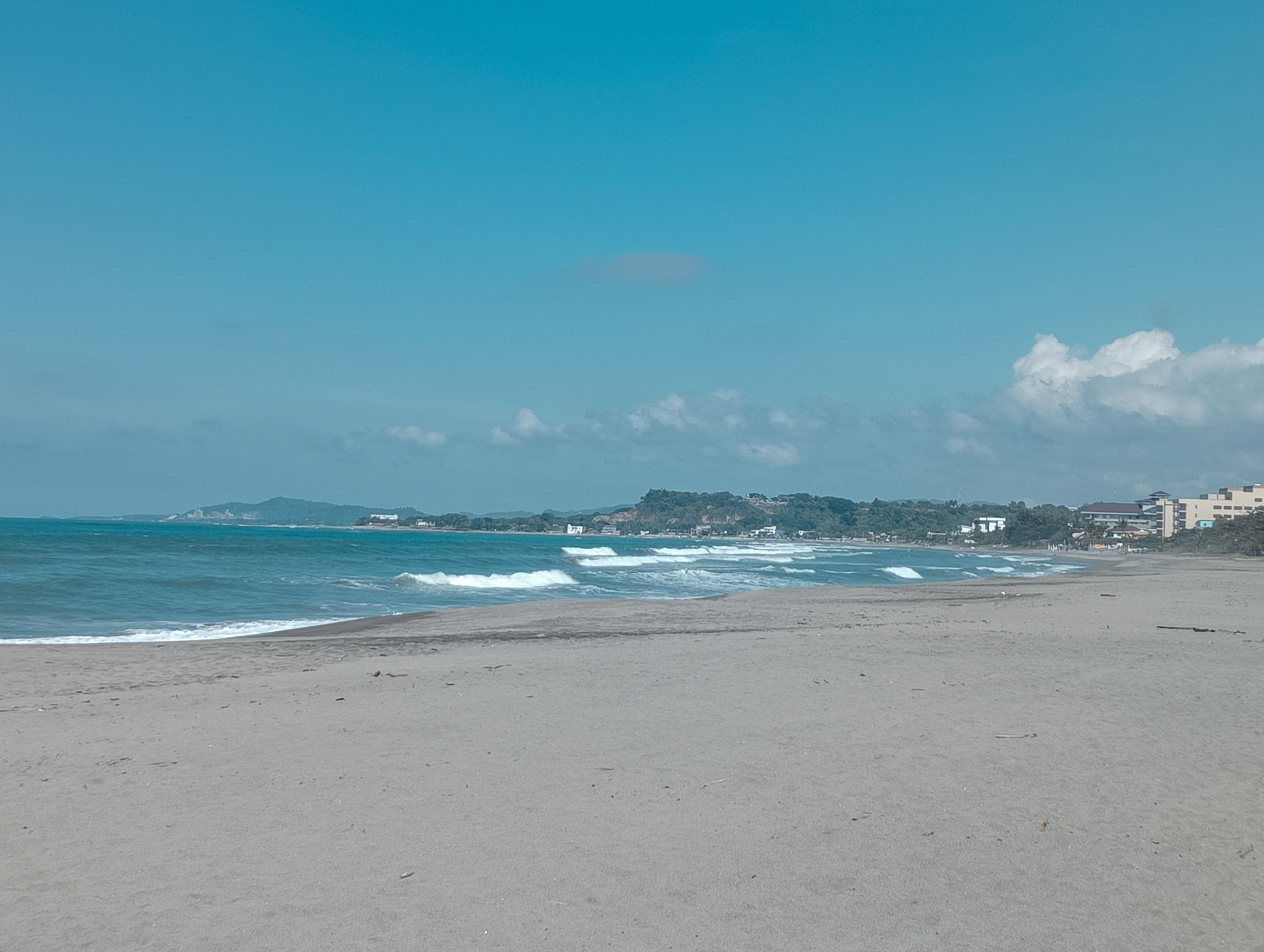
San Juan Beach in Urbiztondo

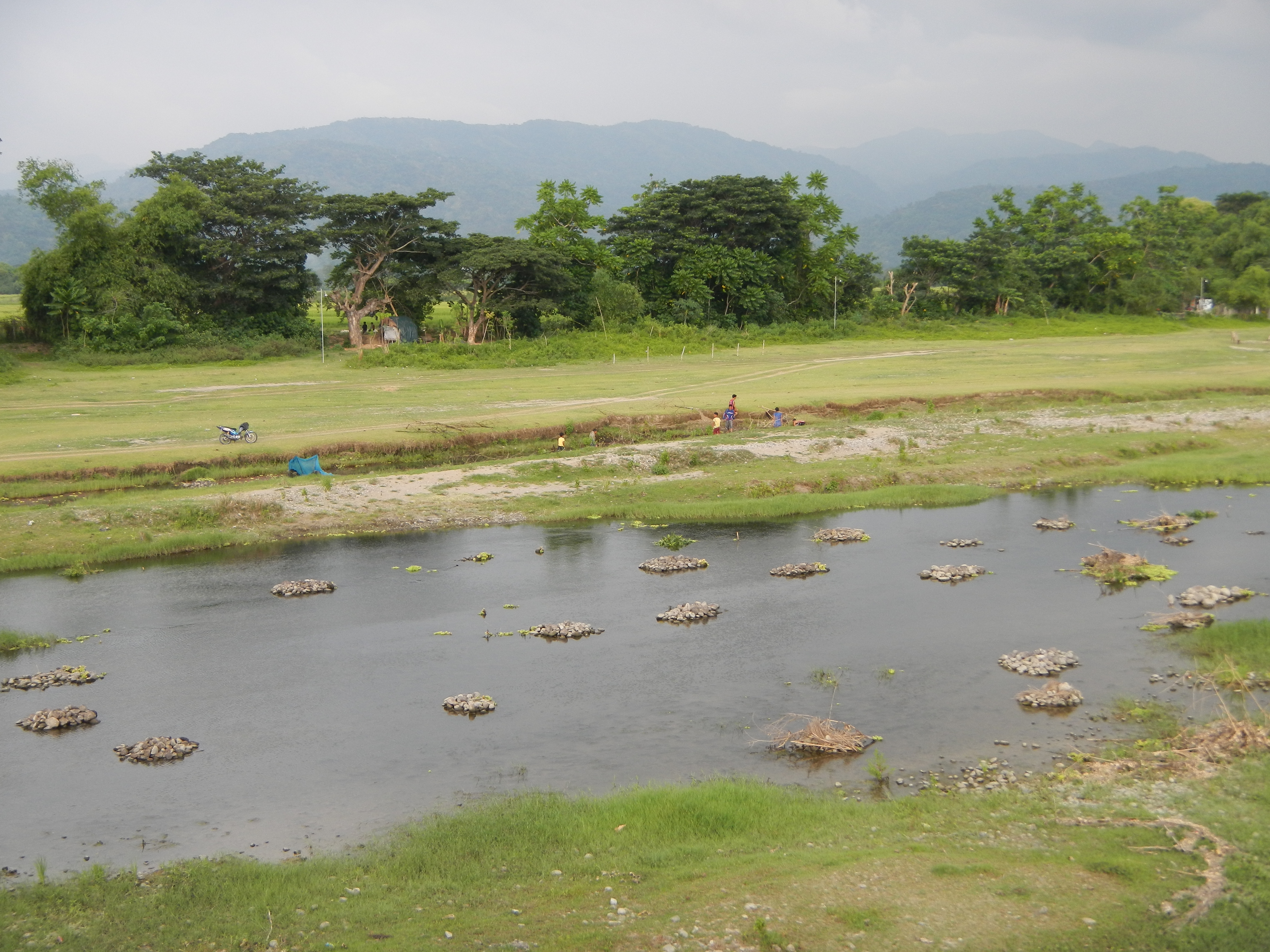
Creek in Naguirangan

The Municipality of San Juan is located in the west of the province of La Union, along the Manila North Road, between latitudes 16°39'N and 16°43'N and longitudes 120°9'E and 120°15'E. San Juan is bounded on the north by the municipality of Bacnotan along the Baroro River, and on the east by the municipalities of San Gabriel and Bagulin along the Dasay-Duplas-Nagyubuyuban Creek. On the south it is bounded by San Fernando and on the west by the South China Sea.

The topography of the town is characterized by hilly and mountainous terrain that gradually rises eastward from its coastal plains along the foothills of the Cordillera Central. The town is also traversed by several creeks and rivers, with the Baroro River being the most prominent. The total land area of San Juan is 5,712 hectares (14,110 acres), which is 4% of the province of La Union. Some 505.08 hectares or 8.46% is claimed by the municipality of Bacnotan and San Fernando City.

San Juan is situated 7.76 kilometres (4.82 mi) from the provincial capital San Fernando, and 273.63 kilometres (170.03 mi) from the country's capital city of Manila.

=== Barangays ===
San Juan is politically subdivided into 41 barangays with upland and lowland barangays. Each barangay consists of puroks and some have sitios.

- Allangigan
- Aludaid
- Bacsayan
- Balballosa
- Bambanay
- Bugbugcao
- Caarusipan
- Cabaroan
- Cabugnayan
- Cacapian
- Caculangan
- Calincamasan
- Casilagan
- Catdongan
- Dangdangla
- Dasay
- Dinanum
- Duplas
- Guinguinabang
- Ili Norte (Poblacion)
- Ili Sur (Poblacion)
- Legleg
- Lubing
- Nadsaag
- Nagsabaran
- Naguirangan
- Naguituban
- Nagyubuyuban
- Oaquing
- Pacpacac
- Pagdildilan
- Panicsican
- Quidem
- San Felipe
- Santa Rosa
- Santo Rosario
- Saracat
- Sinapangan
- Taboc
- Talogtog
- Urbiztondo

=== Climate ===
The climate in San Juan is "dry" from November to April and "wet" from May to October. The south-west monsoon brings abundant rainfall during the wet season, whereas the north-east monsoon passing over the Cordillera Mountains to the east brings the drier conditions. The average annual temperature is 27.2 °C (81.0 °F).

Climate data for San Juan, La Union
Month	Jan	Feb	Mar	Apr	May	Jun	Jul	Aug	Sep	Oct	Nov	Dec	Year
Mean daily maximum °C (°F)	31 (88)	31 (88)	33 (91)	33 (91)	32 (90)	31 (88)	30 (86)	30 (86)	30 (86)	31 (88)	31 (88)	31 (88)	31 (88)
Mean daily minimum °C (°F)	21 (70)	22 (72)	23 (73)	25 (77)	26 (79)	26 (79)	26 (79)	26 (79)	25 (77)	24 (75)	23 (73)	22 (72)	24 (75)
Average precipitation mm (inches)	42 (1.7)	48 (1.9)	74 (2.9)	110 (4.3)	269 (10.6)	275 (10.8)	362 (14.3)	325 (12.8)	330 (13.0)	306 (12.0)	126 (5.0)	61 (2.4)	2,328 (91.7)
Average rainy days	11.2	12.0	17.1	21.2	27.1	26.8	28.1	27.0	26.0	24.5	17.7	12.4	251.1
Source: Meteoblue

== Demographics ==
Population census of San Juan
Year	Pop.	±% p.a.
1903	11,223	—
1918	11,912	+0.40%
1939	10,941	−0.40%
1948	12,521	+1.51%
1960	14,516	+1.24%
1970	17,700	+2.00%
1975	18,339	+0.71%
1980	20,362	+2.11%
1990	25,046	+2.09%
1995	27,795	+1.97%
2000	30,393	+1.93%
2007	32,952	+1.12%
2010	35,098	+2.32%
2015	37,188	+1.11%
2020	40,507	+1.82%
2024	41,319	+0.48%
Source: Philippine Statistics Authority

In the 2020 census, the population of San Juan, La Union, was 98,345 people, with a density of 1,700 inhabitants per square kilometre or 4,400 inhabitants per square mile.

According to a local 1896 census, the population of San Juan was 10,510. At that time, there were twenty-eight barrios inhabited by 9,989 residents, and four rancherias inhabited by 521 "infieles" or non-Christians (Igorots). These barrios were Ili, Barraca, Panicsican, Talogtog, Sabangan, Taboc, Lubing, Sinapangan, Cacapian, Caculangan, Santa Rosa, Caaniyan, Oaquing, Catdongan, Caarusipan, Guinguinabang, Bugbugcao, Pacpacac, Legleg, Nadsaag, Capacuan, Bacnotan, Dasay, Al-langigan, Bombuneg, Balballosa, Duplas and San Felipe. The rancherias were Rancho de Locutan, Indang, Amontoc and Losoya. Yli, also known as Poblacion, had a population of 1,134 residents described as 2 "Españoles peninsulares", 2 "Mestizos de español", 1,122 "naturales" and 8 "Chinos".

In the early 1900s cholera was a scourge that took the lives of many people.

As of the census of 2000, San Juan was home to 30,393 indigenous Ilocano people, concentrated in six barangays along the national highway. This is equivalent to 33.86% of the total population and is growing at the rate of 1.8% per annum. The average population density was 2,964 persons per square kilometer. In the two urban barangays where some 15% of the population reside, the population density rose to 3,073 persons per square kilometer, while in the remaining rural barangays the population density was 2,886 persons per square kilometer.

=== Language ===
Ilocano is the predominant language of the municipality.

== Economy ==
=== Agriculture ===
Agriculture is the primary source of livelihood for the residents of San Juan, La Union. The municipality has approximately 1,765 hectares of land dedicated to rice cultivation, 722 hectares to tobacco and corn, and the remainder to vegetables and root crops. Yellow corn, a key agricultural product, is widely grown in the area and serves as a raw material for various food and industrial products, including starch, corn oil, beverages, gluten, and snacks. It also accounts for around 50% of the feed used in local livestock and poultry industries. Yellow corn was nominated as the town's product under the One Town One Product (OTOP) Philippines program, an initiative of President Gloria Macapagal Arroyo aimed at promoting entrepreneurship and generating employment.

=== Cottage Industries ===
San Juan is home to several thriving cottage industries, including damili (pottery), which produces items such as pots, animal feed containers, well pipes, decorative pottery, roof tiles, and traditional Ilocano earthenware such as burnay (earthen jars) and dalikan (firewood stoves). Other notable folk industries in the town include blanket-weaving, basketry, bamboo craft, and soft broom-making. Additionally, hollow concrete blocks are produced in rural areas for use in local construction projects.

=== Tourism ===
San Juan is considered to be the Surfing Capital of the Northern Philippines and is known for its consistent intermediate quality surf and two surfing seasons from July to October and November to March. There is also a famous waterfall located at barangay Duplas called pipti papawes falls .

There is also a local museum, Museo de San Juan.

Poverty incidence of San Juan (%)

Source: Philippine Statistics Authority

=== Transportation ===
The town is MacArthur Highway, and will be served by the extension of TPLEX for motorists coming from Manila instead of that highway.

== Government ==
=== Local government ===
San Juan, belonging to the first congressional district of the province of La Union, is governed by a mayor designated as its local chief executive and by a municipal council as its legislative body in accordance with the Local Government Code. The mayor, vice mayor, and the councilors are elected directly by the people through an election which is being held every three years.

=== Elected officials ===
Members of the Municipal Council (2025–present)
Position	Name
Congressman	Francisco Paolo P. Ortega V
Mayor	Mariquita P. Ortega
Vice-Mayor	Arturo P. Valdriz
Councilors	Mitos Magsaysay
Councilors	Kyle F. Carpio
Councilors	Arnel Peralta
Councilors	Louie Fontanilla
Councilors	Norma B. Lim
Councilors	Athena Lopez Nang
Councilors	Eusebio Lim
Councilors	Aldreick G. Carillo

== Education ==
The San Juan Schools District Office governs all educational institutions within the municipality. It oversees the management and operations of all private and public elementary and high schools.

=== Primary and elementary schools ===
- Bacsayan Elementary School
- Balballosa Elementary School
- Bugbugcao Elementary School
- Caagraoan Elementary School
- Cabaroan Elementary School
- Concordia Learning Center
- Dasay Elementary School
- Escuela San Juan Bautista
- Holy Angels Montessori and Learning Center
- Legleg Elementary School
- Lorma Grade School
- Lubing Elementary School
- Nadsaag Elementary School
- Naguituban Elementary School
- San Felipe Elementary School
- San Juan Central Elementary School
- Sta. Rosa Elementary School
- Sto. Rosario Elementary School
- Taboc Elementary School
- UCCP - Nursery-Kindergarten School
- Urbiztondo Elementary School

=== Secondary schools ===
- Lorma Colleges Science High School
- Lorma Colleges Senior High School
- Sto. Rosario National High School
- San Juan National High School
- San Juan Senior High School

== Gallery ==
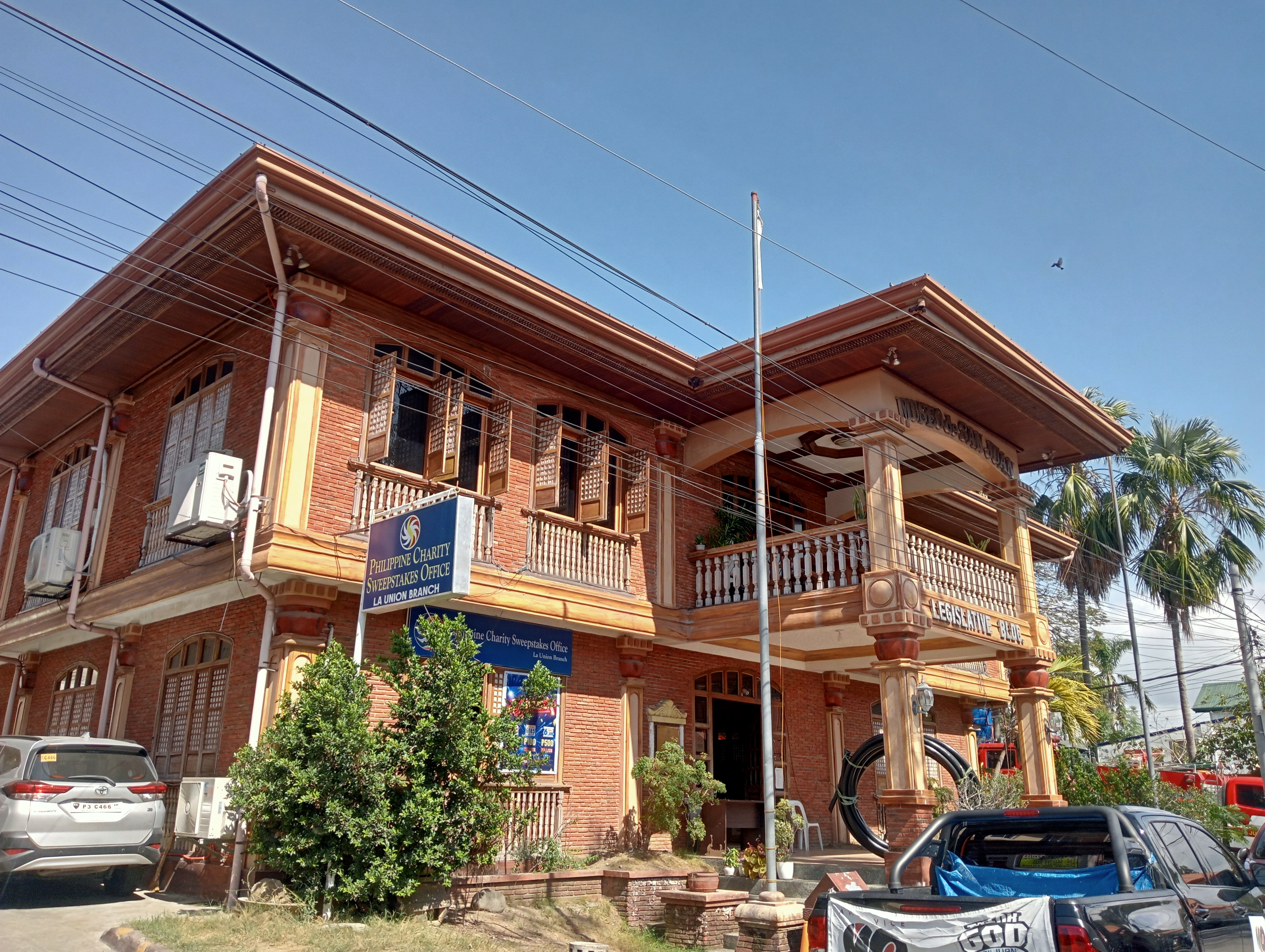
Museo de San Juan

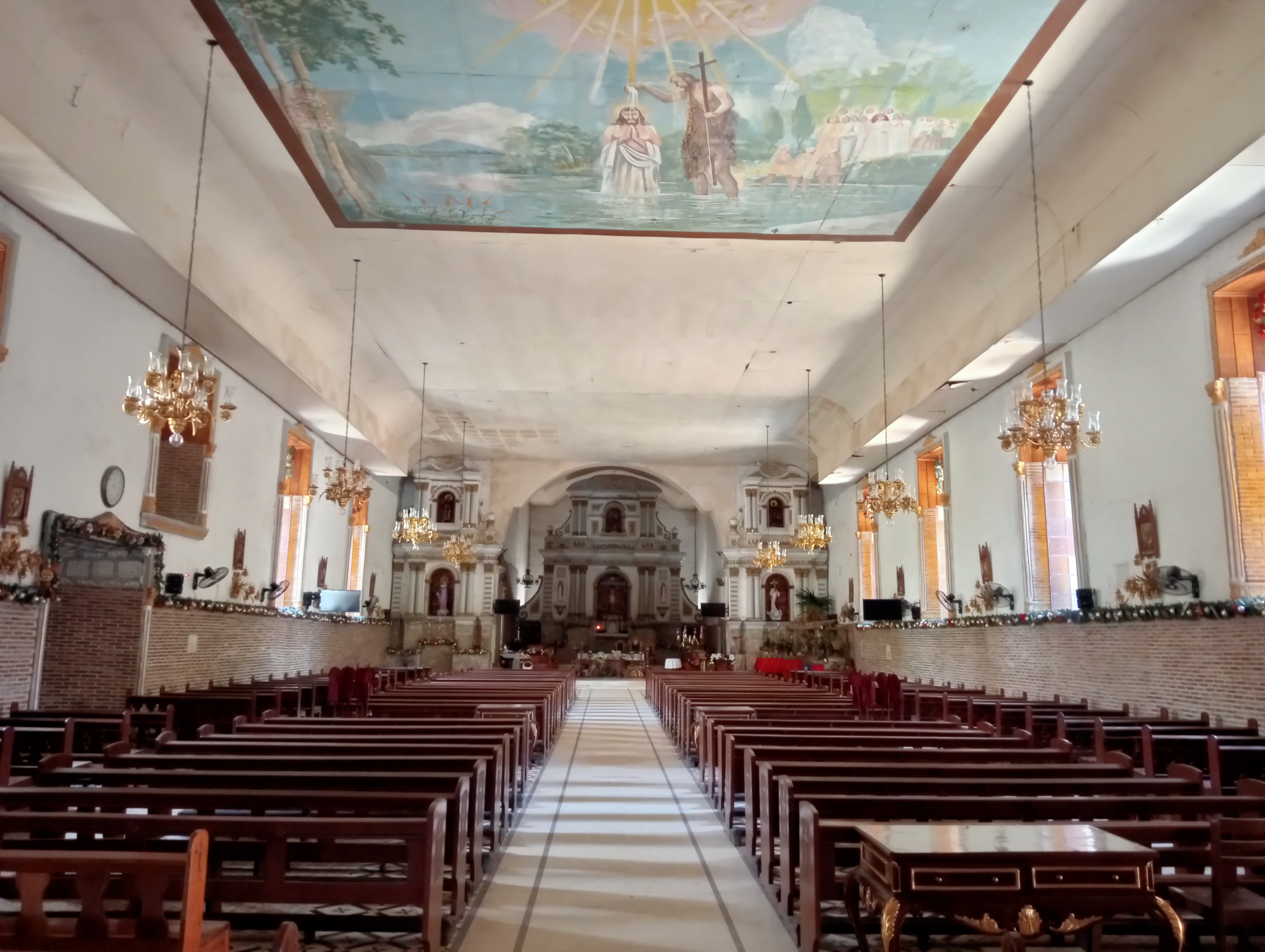
St. John the Baptist Parish

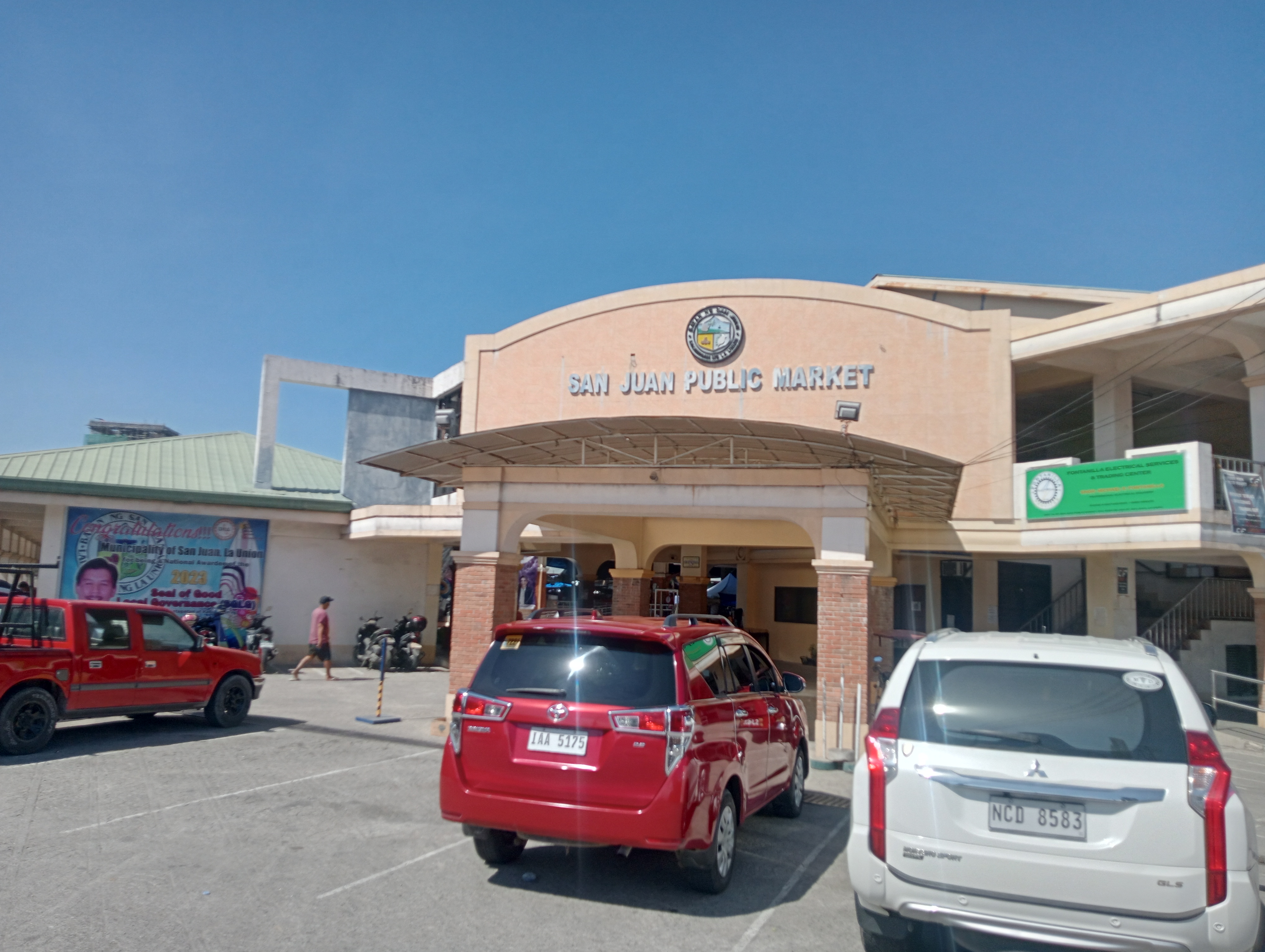
Public Market

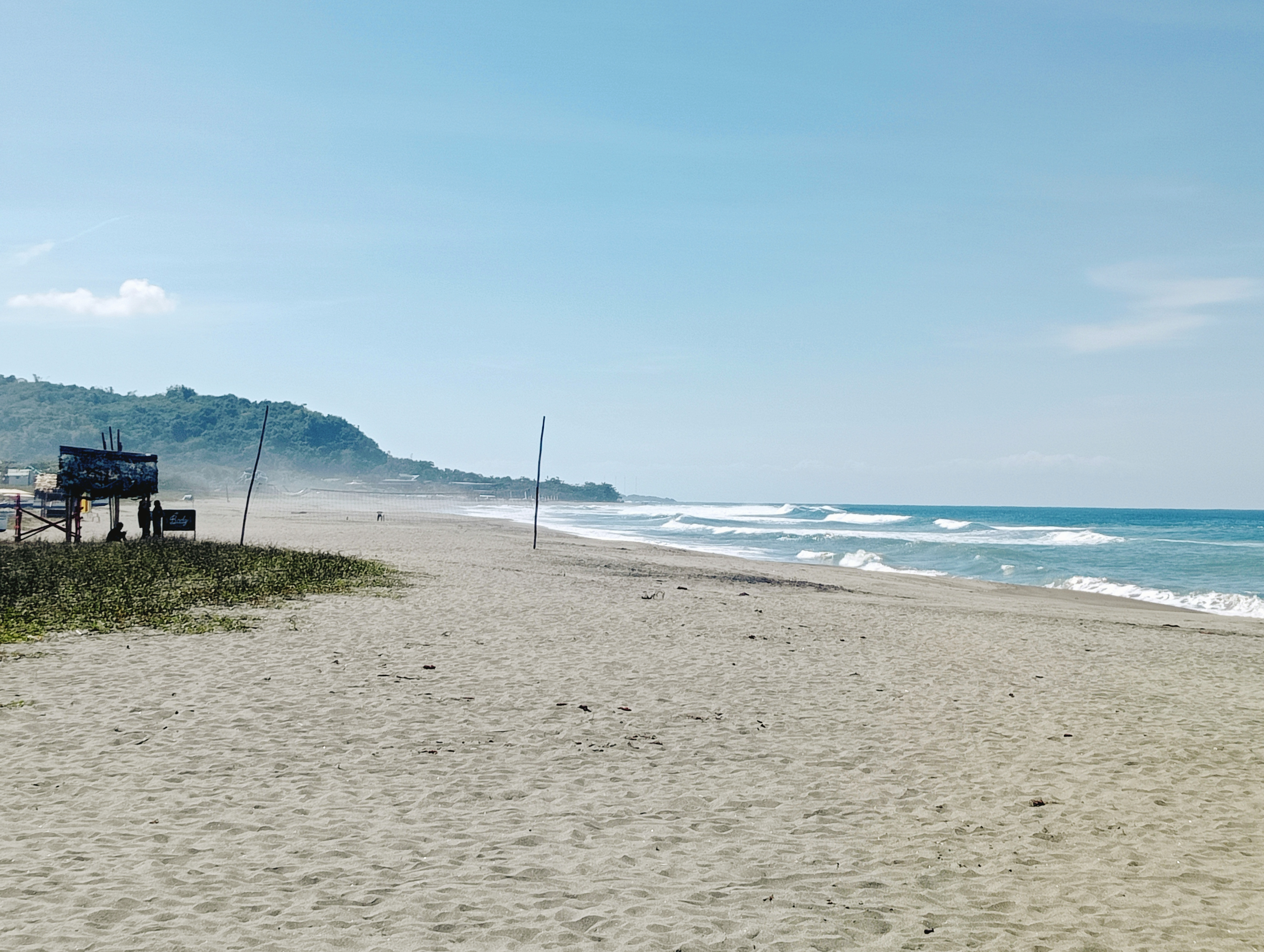
Beach in San Juan

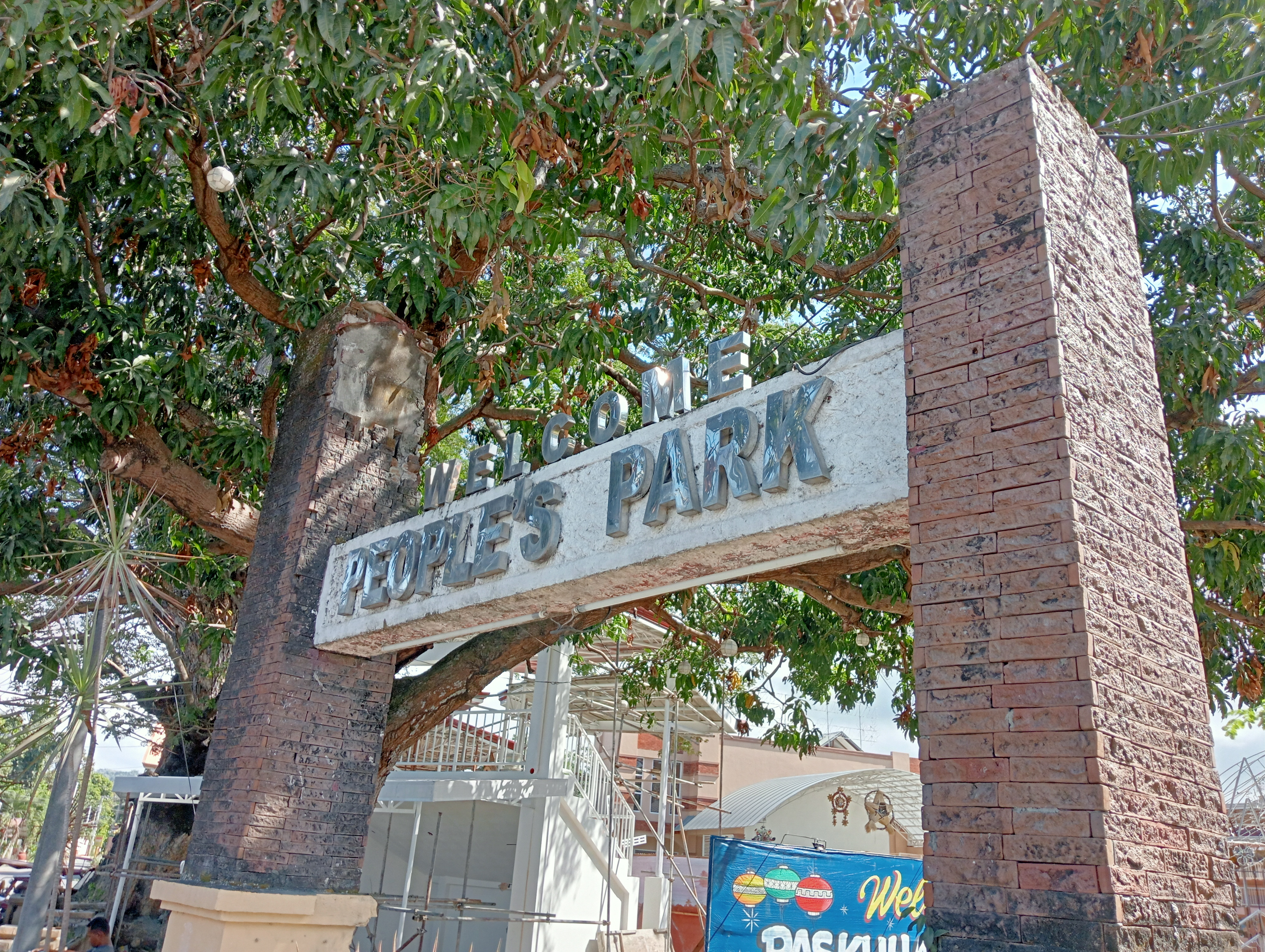
People's Park

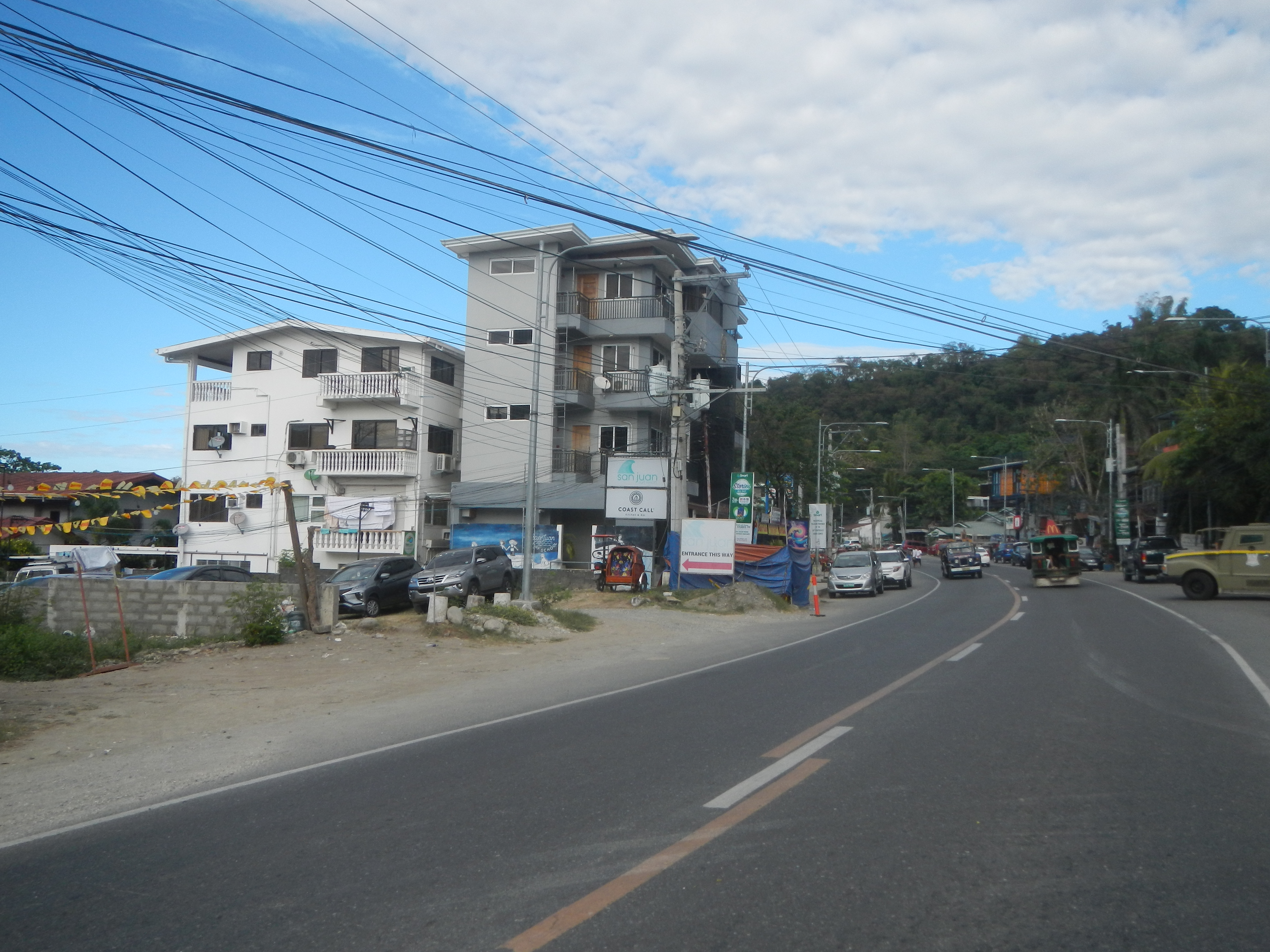
Urbiztondo

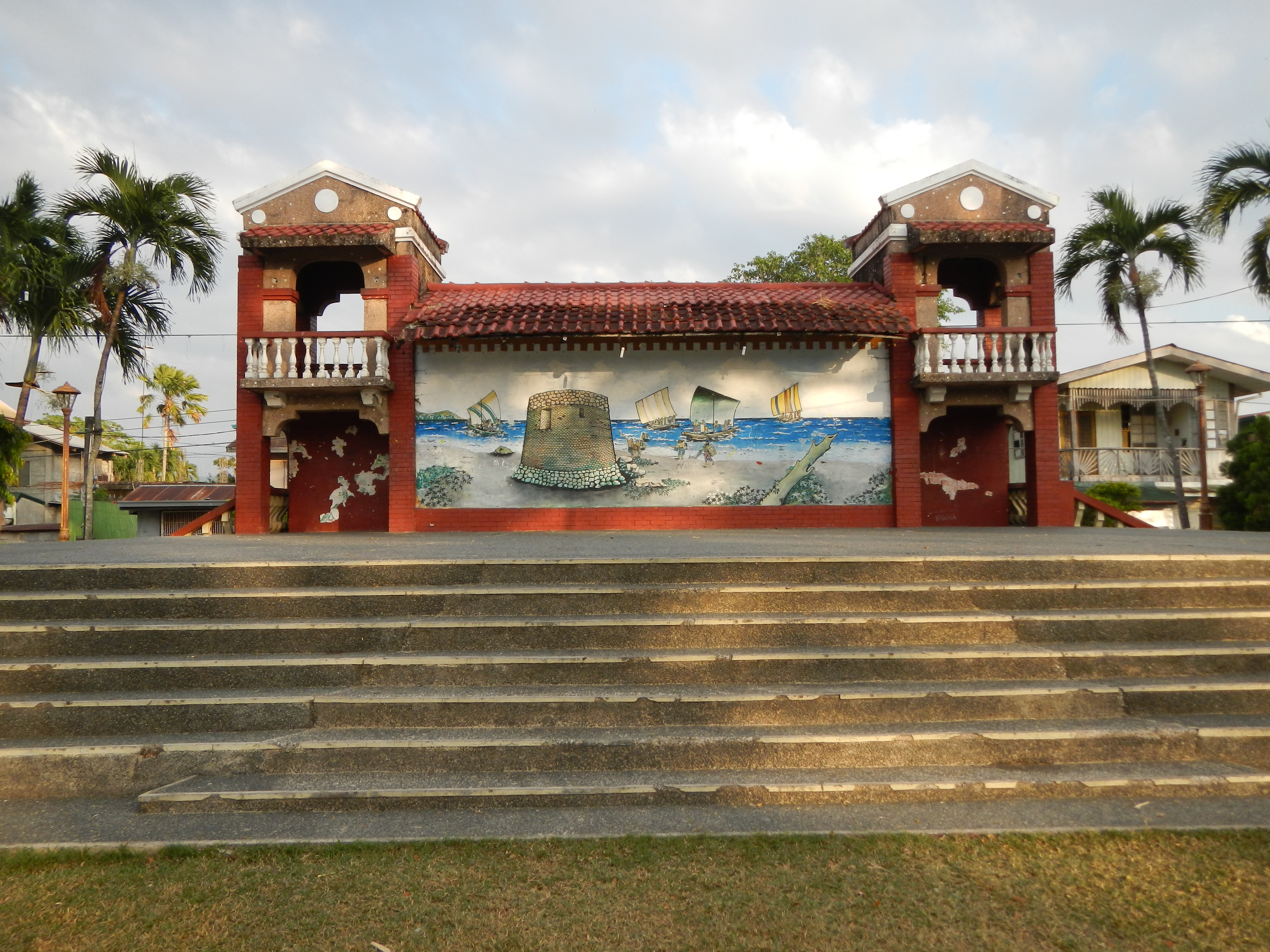
Town Plaza
