= Bacnotan =

Municipality in La Union, Philippines

- Municipality
- Municipality of Bacnotan
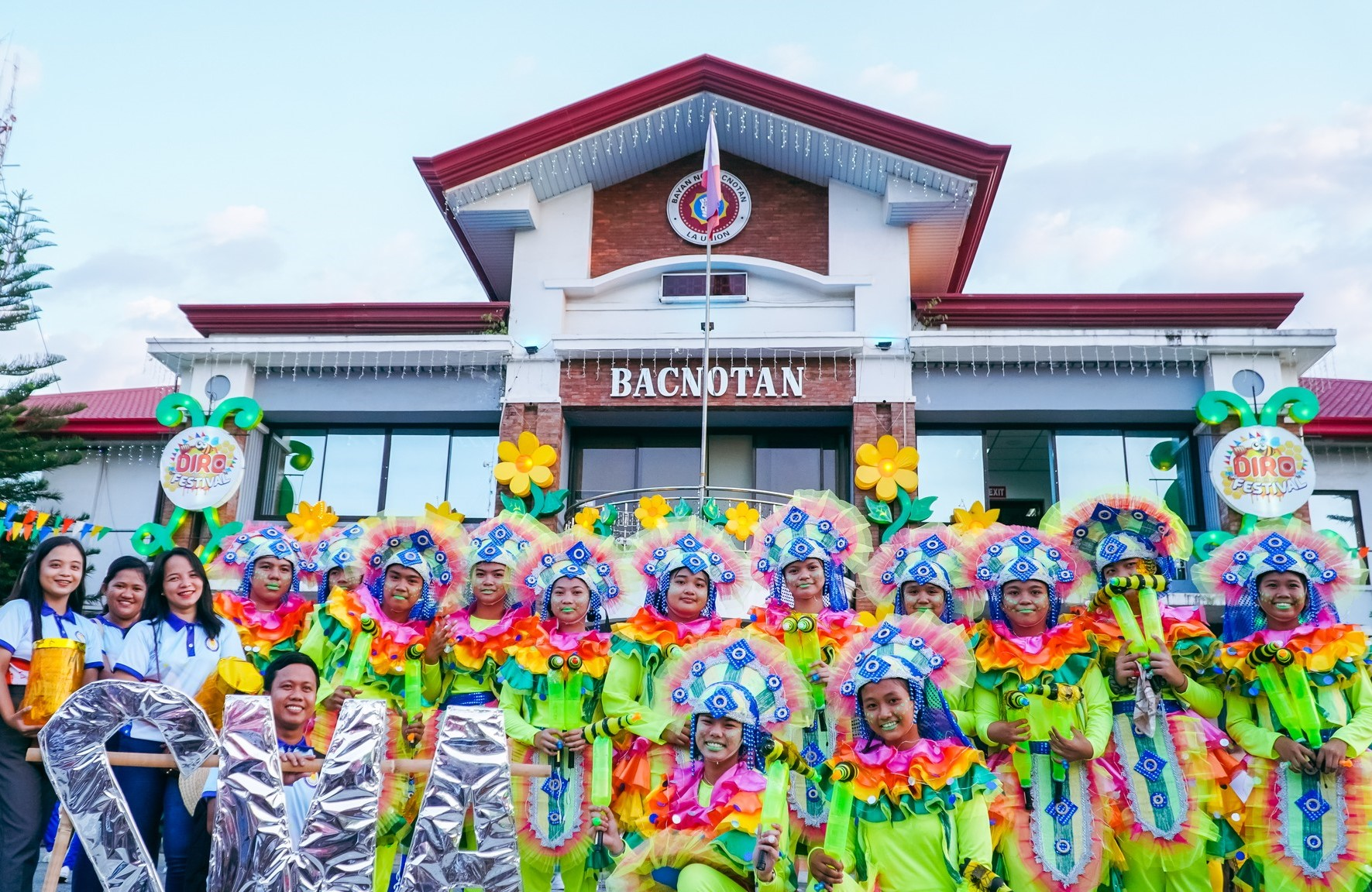
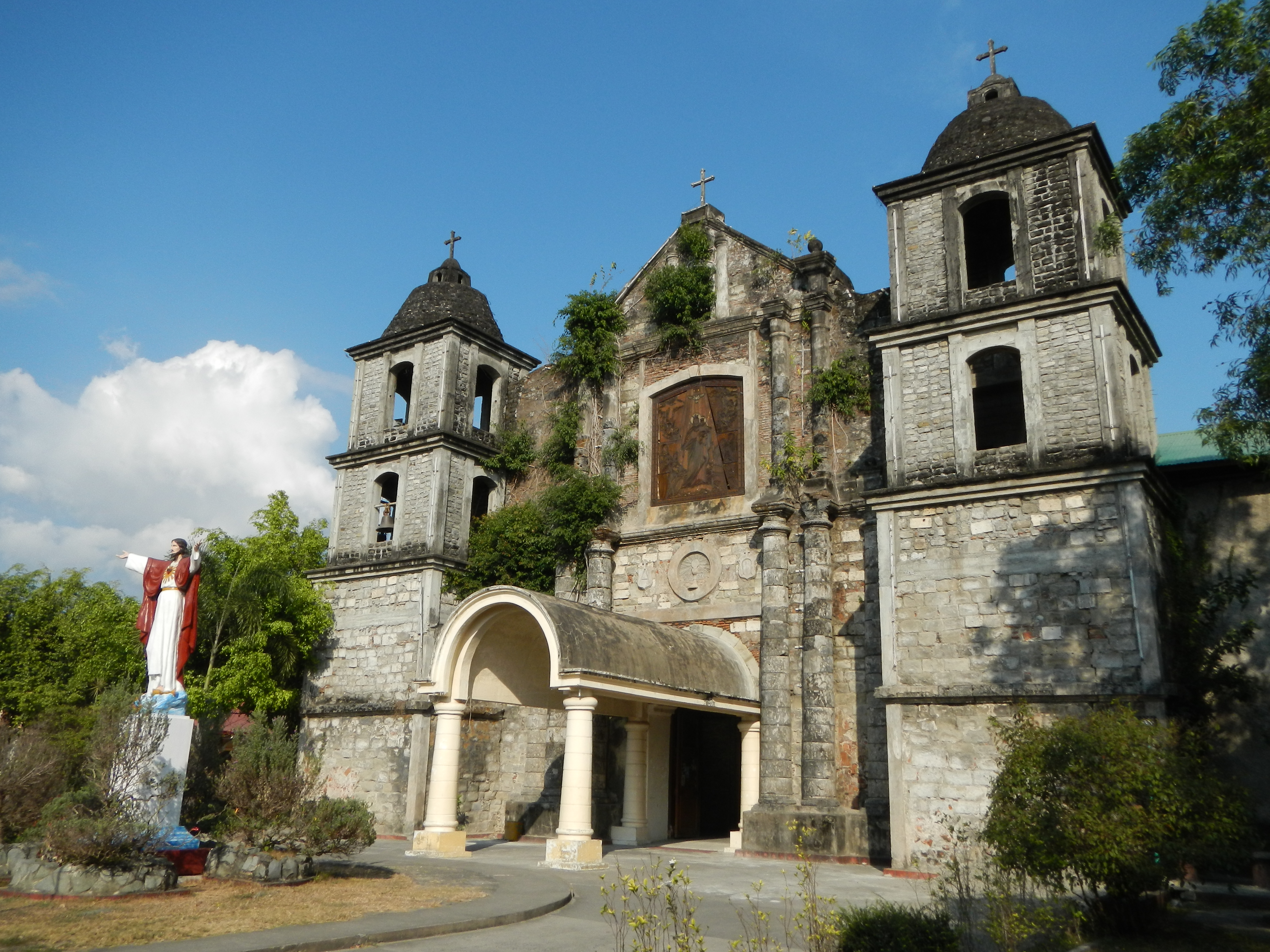
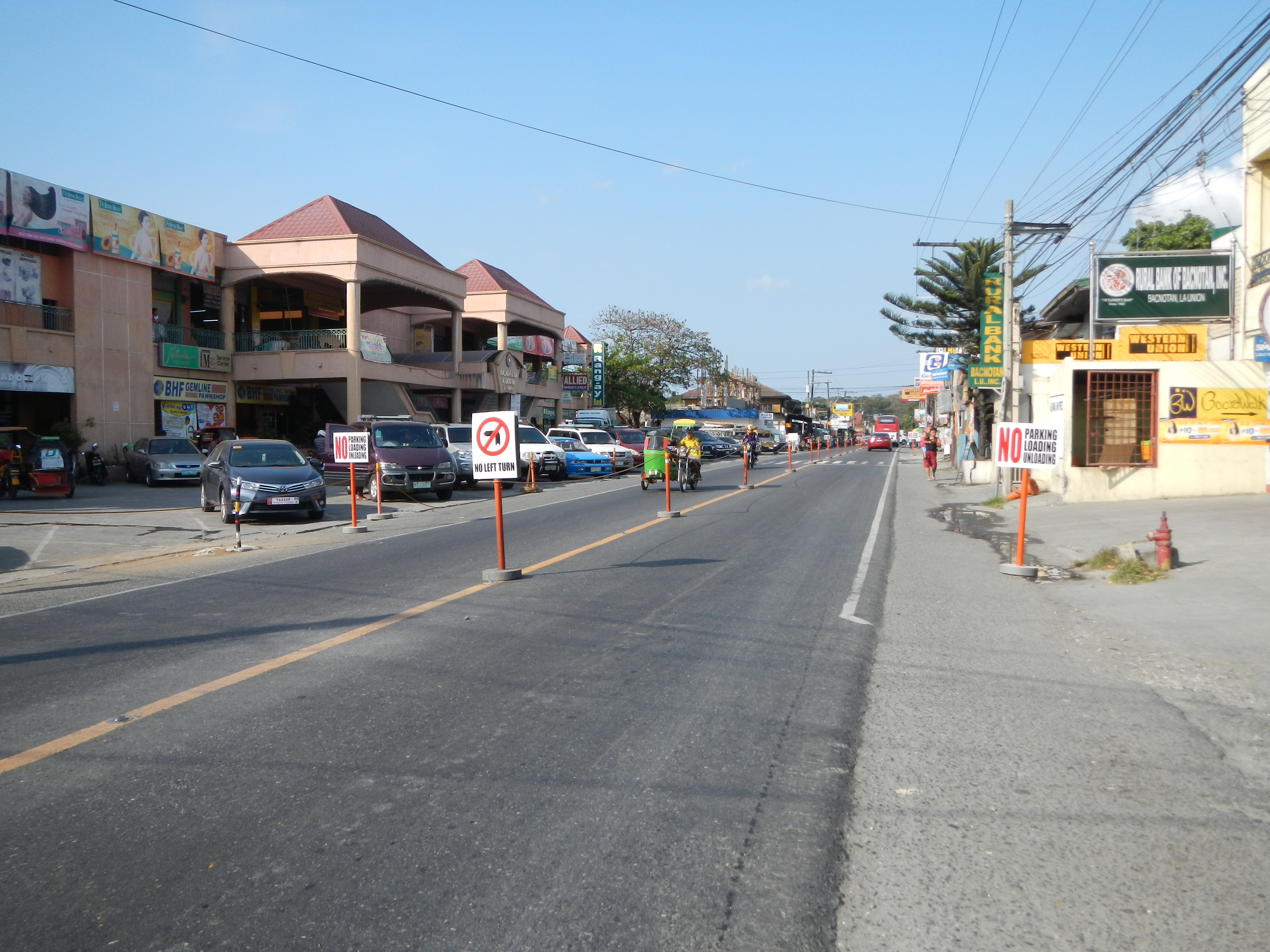
- Bacnotan Municipal Hall, St. Michael the Archangel Parish Church & Town center

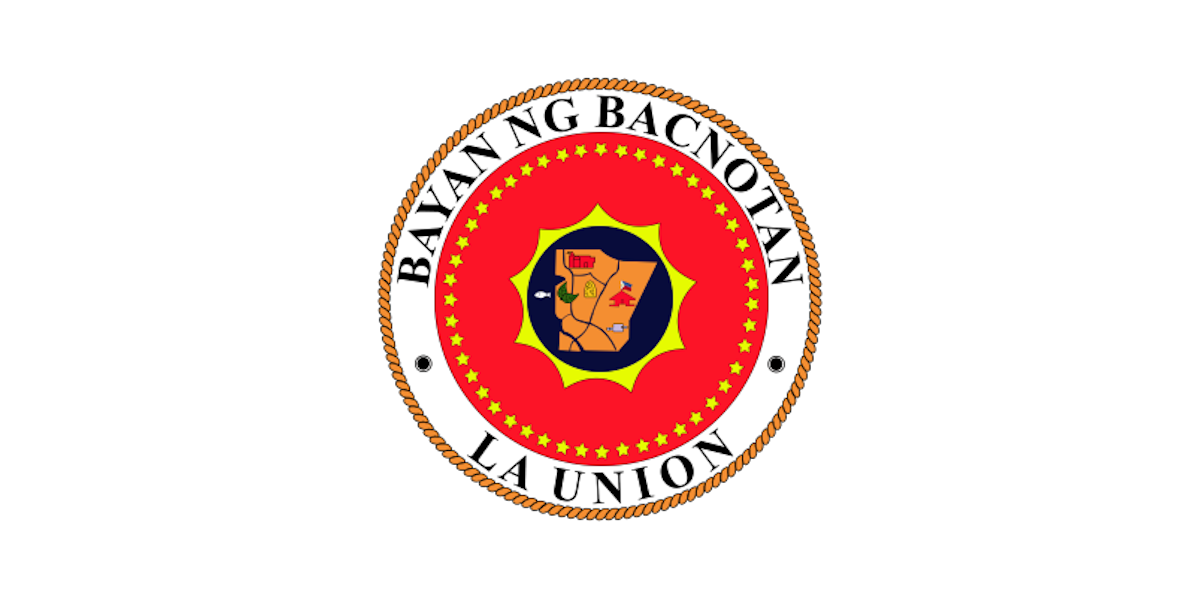
- Flag Seal
- Nicknames: Honey Capital of the North; Cement Capital of the North
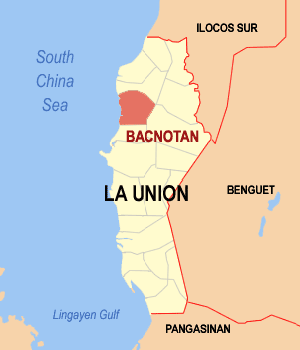
- Map of La Union with Bacnotan highlighted
- Interactive map of Bacnotan
- Location within the Philippines
- Coordinates: 16°43′11″N 120°20′53″E
- Country: Philippines
- Region: Ilocos Region
- Province: La Union
- District: 1st district
- Founded: 1599
- Barangays: 47 (see Barangays)

Government
  - Type: Sangguniang Bayan
  - Mayor: Francisco Angelito L. Fontanilla
  - Vice Mayor: Divina C. Fontanilla
  - Representative: Francisco Paolo P. Ortega V
  - Municipal Council: Members: Jane A. Gonzales; Edijer F. Valmonte; Olga Jane C. Panelo; Virgilio C. Antolin; Franklin N. Almodovar; Francisco H. Fontanilla Jr.; Federico R. Corpuz; Tomas Joaquin B. Ortega
  - Electorate: 27,733 voters (2025)

Area
  - Total: 76.60 km^{2} (29.58 sq mi)
- Elevation: 22 m (72 ft)
- Highest elevation: 238 m (781 ft)
- Lowest elevation: 0 m (0 ft)

Population (2024 census)
  - Total: 45,203
  - Density: 590.1/km^{2} (1,528/sq mi)
  - Households: 11,675

Economy
  - Income class: 1st municipal income class
  - Poverty incidence: 5.28% (2023)
  - Revenue: ₱ 391.8 million (2024)
  - Assets: ₱ 102.1 million (2024)
  - Expenditure: ₱ 303.5 million (2024)
  - Liabilities: ₱ 69.07 million (2024)

Service provider
  - Electricity: La Union Electric Cooperative (LUELCO)
- Time zone: UTC+8 (PST)
- ZIP code: 2515
- PSGC: 0103303000
- IDD : area code: +63 (0)72
- Native languages: Ilocano; Tagalog
- Website: www.bacnotan.gov.ph

Bacnotan, officially the Municipality of Bacnotan (Ilocano: Ili ti Bacnotan; Filipino: Bayan ng Bacnotan), is a municipality in the province of La Union, Philippines. According to the 2024 census, it has a population of 45,203 people.

== Etymology ==
The name Bacnotan may come from the word "bakunuttan", which means "to flog".

== History ==
Around 1571, the Spaniards occupied Ilokos Province. In February 2, 1818, the Real Cedula separated the region into two parts: Ilocos Norte and Ilocos Sur. Bacnotan is part of the Ilocos Sur around the time. Around 1846 to 1849, La Union was established, and that province included Bacnotan.

== Geography ==
The Municipality of Bacnotan is surrounded by Balaoan from the North, San Gabriel from the east, and San Juan from the south, and West Philippine Sea from the west.

=== Barangays ===
As of 2020, Bacnotan is politically subdivided into 47 barangays. Each barangay consists of puroks and some have sitios.

- Agtipal
- Arosip
- Bacqui
- Bacsil
- Bagutot
- Ballogo
- Baroro
- Bitalag
- Bulala
- Burayoc
- Bussaoit
- Cabaroan
- Cabarsican
- Cabugao
- Calautit
- Carcarmay
- Casiaman
- Galongen
- Guinabang
- Legleg
- Lisqueb
- Mabanengbeng 1st
- Mabanengbeng 2nd
- Maragayap
- Nagatiran
- Nagsaraboan
- Nagsimbaanan
- Nangalisan
- Narra
- Ortega
- Oya-oy
- Paagan
- Pandan
- Pang-pang
- Poblacion
- Quirino
- Raois
- Salincob
- San Martin
- Santa Cruz
- Santa Rita
- Sapilang
- Sayoan
- Sipulo
- Tammocalao
- Ubbog
- Zaragosa

=== Climate ===
The climate in Bacnotan is dry from November to May and wet from mid-May to October. The south-west monsoon brings an abundant rainfall experienced during the wet season. The relatively dry season is caused by the north-east monsoon passing over the Cordillera Mountain Range. Average temperature is 27.2 °C (81.0 °F).

Climate data for Bacnotan, La Union
Month	Jan	Feb	Mar	Apr	May	Jun	Jul	Aug	Sep	Oct	Nov	Dec	Year
Mean daily maximum °C (°F)	31 (88)	31 (88)	33 (91)	33 (91)	32 (90)	31 (88)	30 (86)	30 (86)	30 (86)	31 (88)	31 (88)	31 (88)	31 (88)
Mean daily minimum °C (°F)	21 (70)	22 (72)	23 (73)	25 (77)	26 (79)	26 (79)	26 (79)	26 (79)	25 (77)	24 (75)	23 (73)	22 (72)	24 (75)
Average precipitation mm (inches)	42 (1.7)	48 (1.9)	74 (2.9)	110 (4.3)	269 (10.6)	275 (10.8)	362 (14.3)	325 (12.8)	330 (13.0)	306 (12.0)	126 (5.0)	61 (2.4)	2,328 (91.7)
Average rainy days	11.2	12.0	17.1	21.2	27.1	26.8	28.1	27.0	26.0	24.5	17.7	12.4	251.1
Source: Meteoblue

== Demographics ==
The household population of Bacnotan as of the 2024 Census of Population and Housing, was recorded at 45,203 people.

Population census of Bacnotan
Year	Pop.	±% p.a.
1903	8,883	—
1918	11,619	+1.81%
1939	11,678	+0.02%
1948	13,793	+1.87%
1960	15,859	+1.17%
1970	21,031	+2.86%
1975	23,126	+1.92%
1980	24,800	+1.41%
1990	29,568	+1.77%
1995	32,634	+1.87%
2000	35,419	+1.77%
2007	38,743	+1.24%
2010	40,307	+1.45%
2015	42,078	+0.82%
2020	44,388	+1.13%
2024	45,203	+0.44%
Source: Philippine Statistics Authority

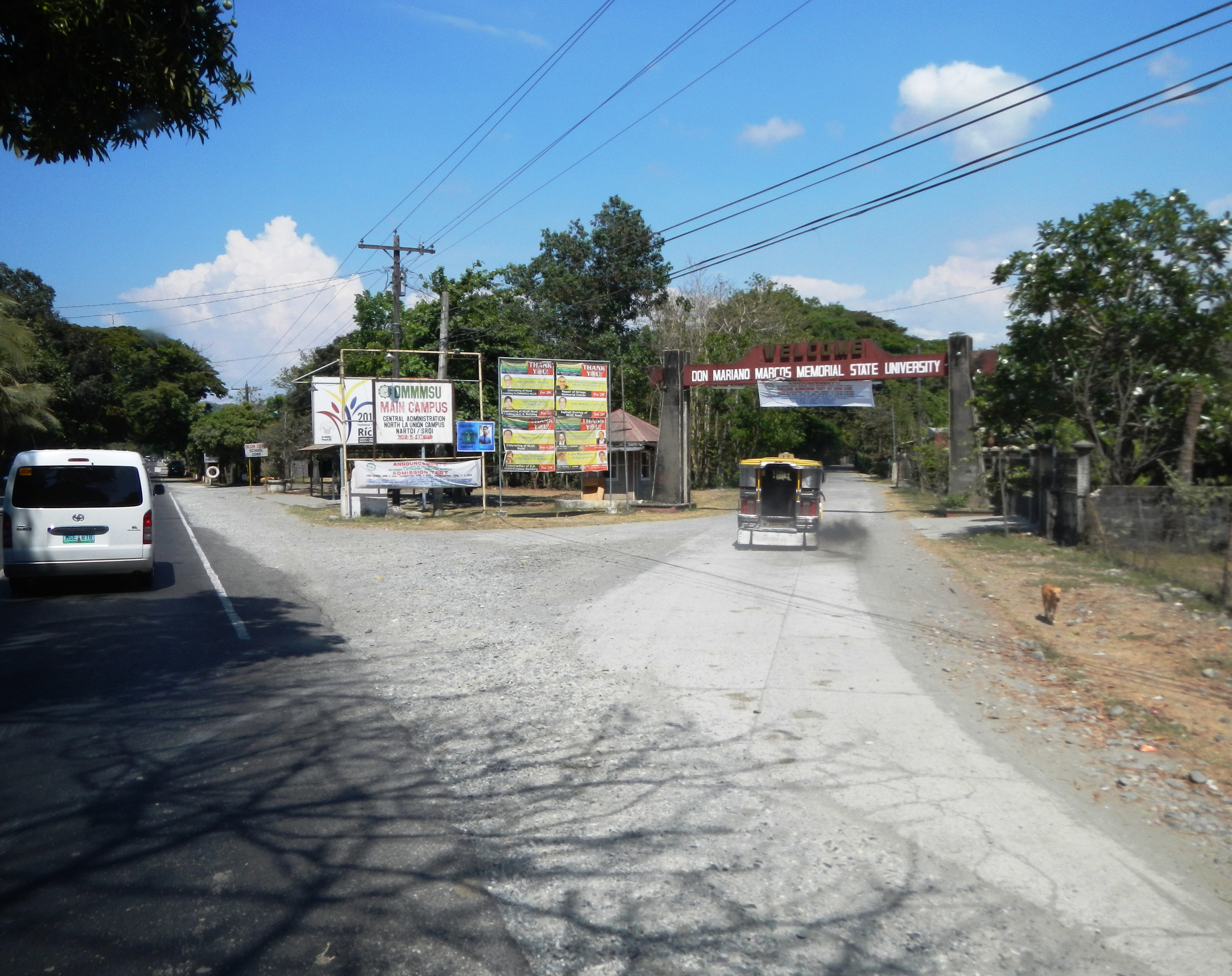
Don Mariano Marcos Memorial State University - North La Union Campus

== Education ==
As of 2020-2021, in the public sector, there are 16 elementary schools, 1 public secondary school, and 1 public integrated school that offers K to 12 education. In the private sector, there are 2 private elementary schools and 1 private secondary school. There is 1 state university for higher education.

== Economy ==
Poverty incidence of Bacnotan

Source: Philippine Statistics Authority

== Government ==
=== Local government ===
Bacnotan, belonging to the first congressional district of the province of La Union, is governed by a mayor designated as its local chief executive and by a municipal council as its legislative body in accordance with the Local Government Code. The mayor, vice mayor, and the councilors are elected directly by the people through an election which is being held every three years.

=== Elected officials ===
Members of the Municipal Council (2019–2022)
Position	Name
Congressman	Pablo C. Ortega
Mayor	Francisco Angelito L. Fontanilla
Vice-Mayor	Divina C. Fontanilla
Councilors	Jane A. Gonzales
Councilors	Edijer F. Valmonte
Councilors	Olga Jane C. Panelo
Councilors	Virgilio C. Antolin
Councilors	Franklin N. Almodovar
Councilors	Francisco H. Fontanilla Jr.
Councilors	Federico R. Corpuz
Councilors	Tomas Joaquin B. Ortega

== Notable personalities ==
Bacnotan has produced notable personalities in various endeavors. Some of them are as follows:

- Erlinda Fadera-Basilio — Ambassador and Permanent Representative of the Philippines to the United Nations and other International Organizations in Geneva, Switzerland; first woman Vice President of the UN Human Rights Council. Currently Philippine ambassador to China, Mongolia and North Korea.
- Fr. Bienvenido Nebres — longest-serving university president of Ateneo de Manila University

== Gallery ==
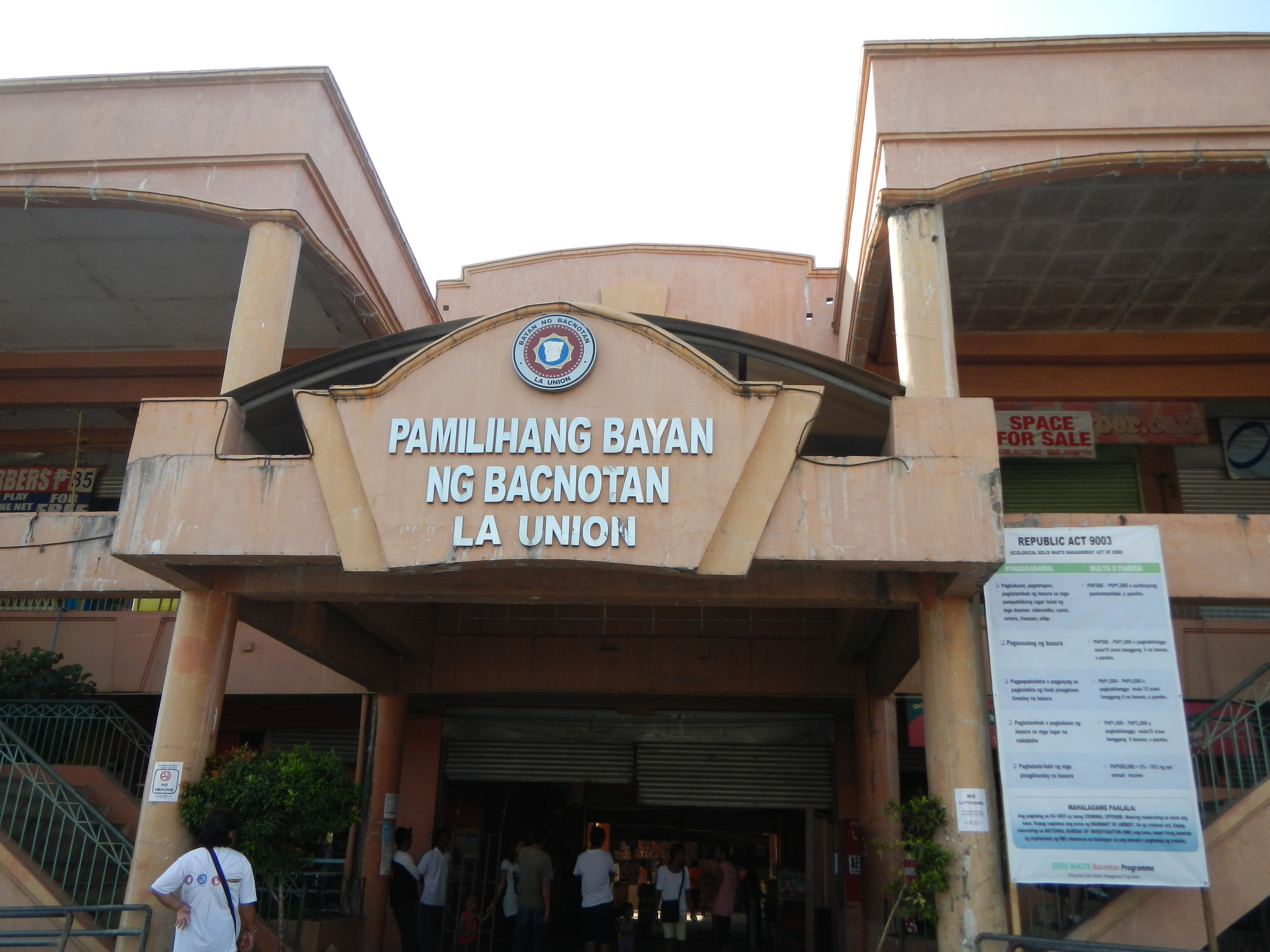
Bacnotan Public Market

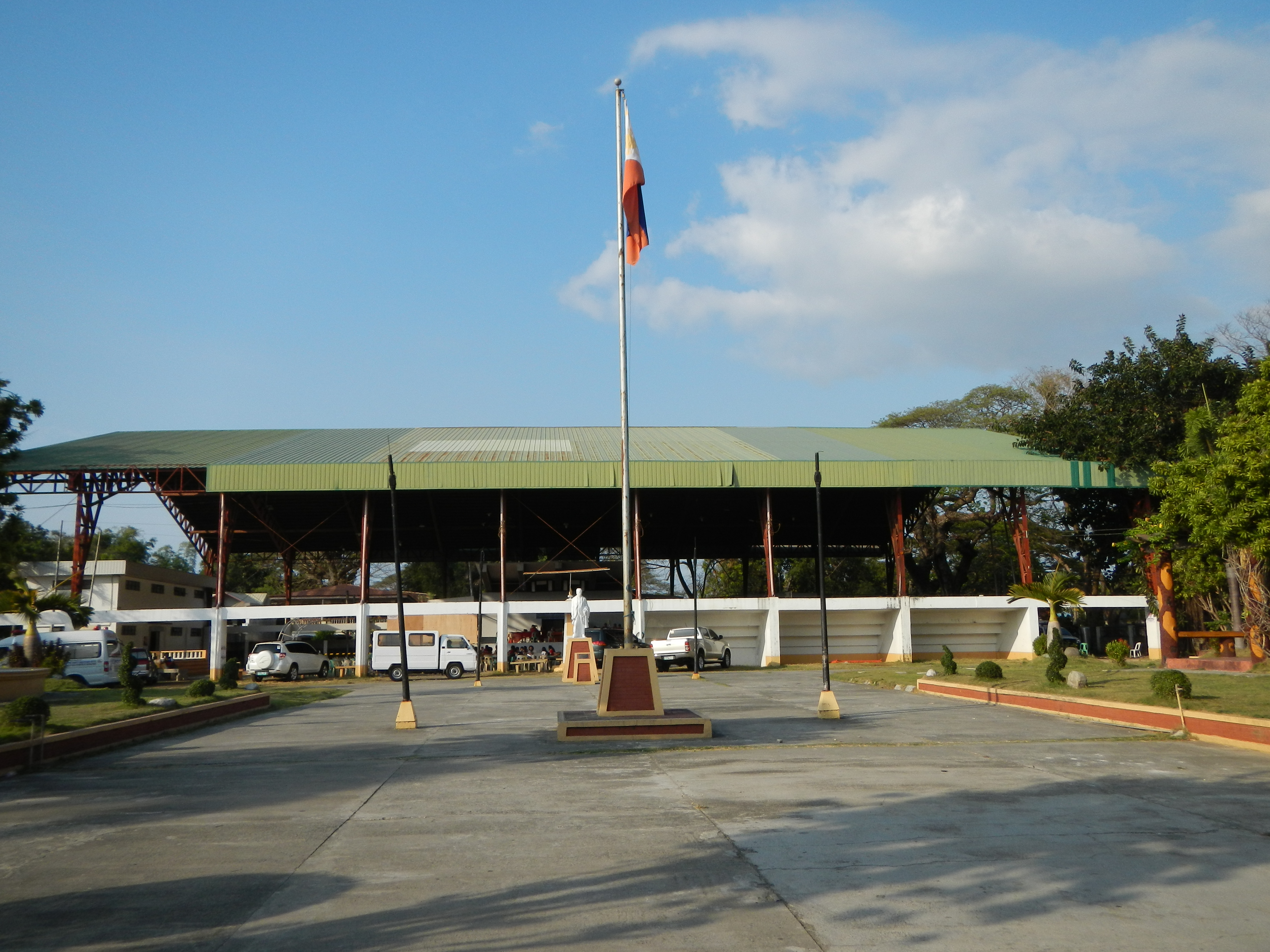
Town plaza

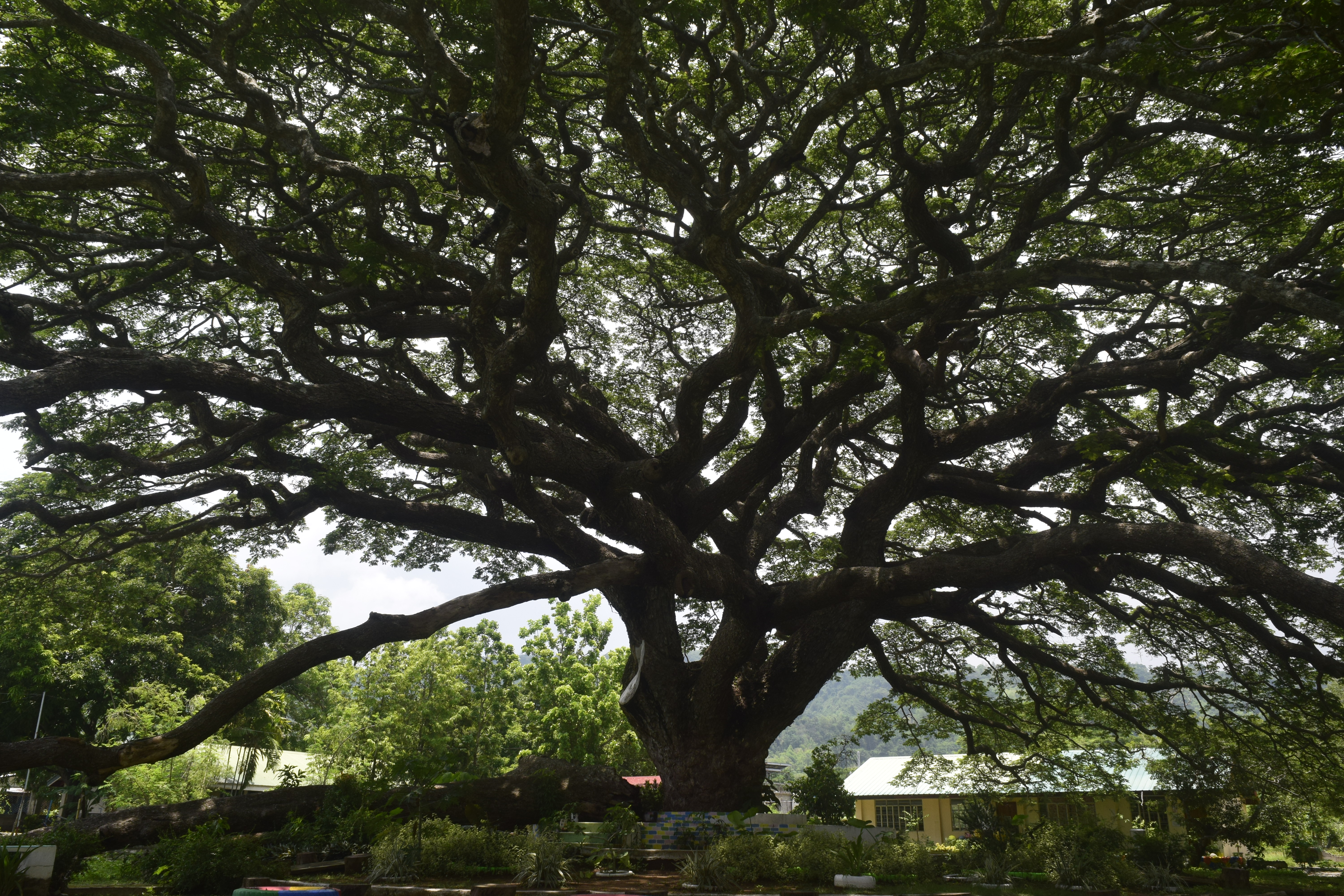
Centennial Tree

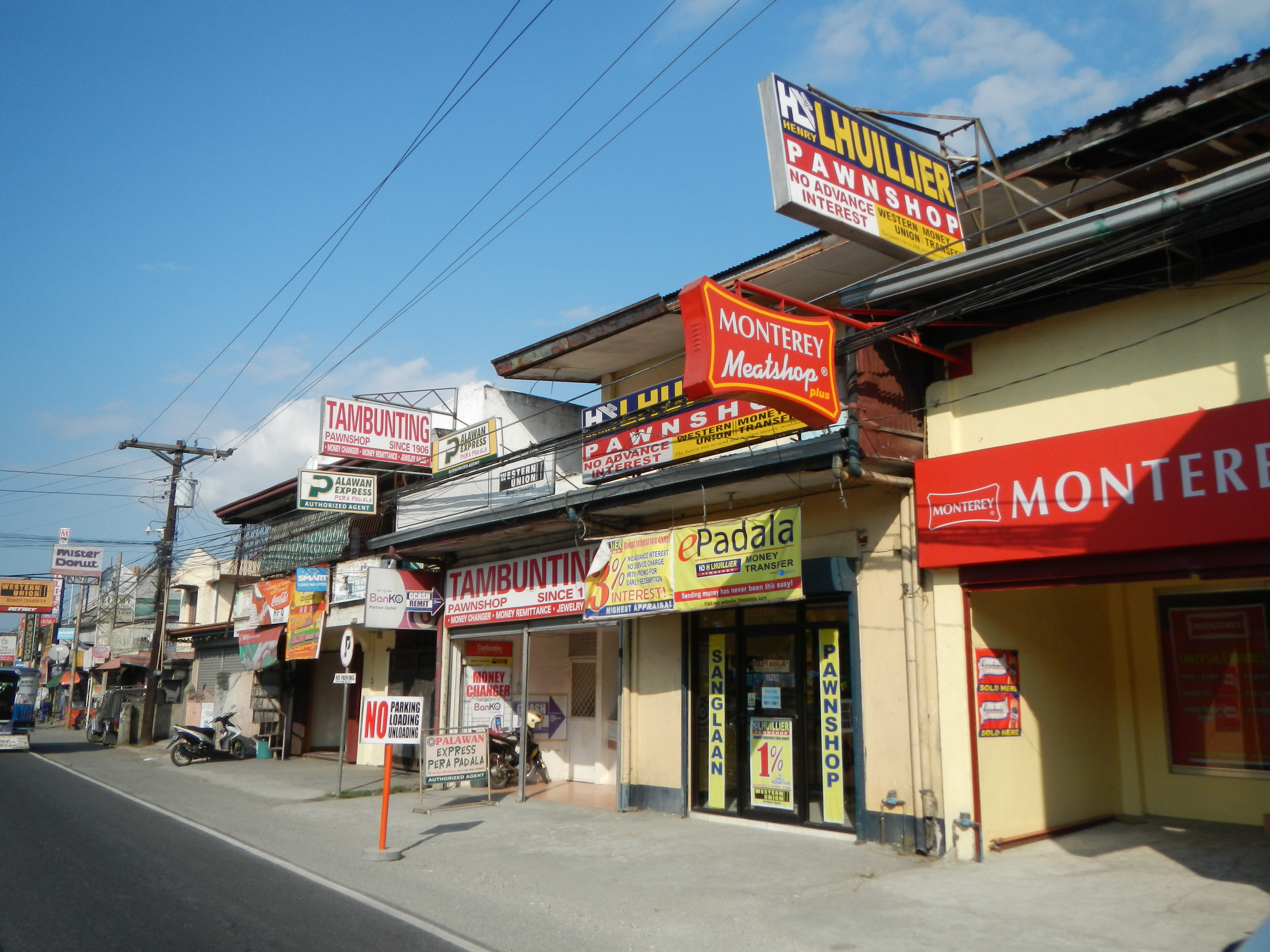
Town Proper

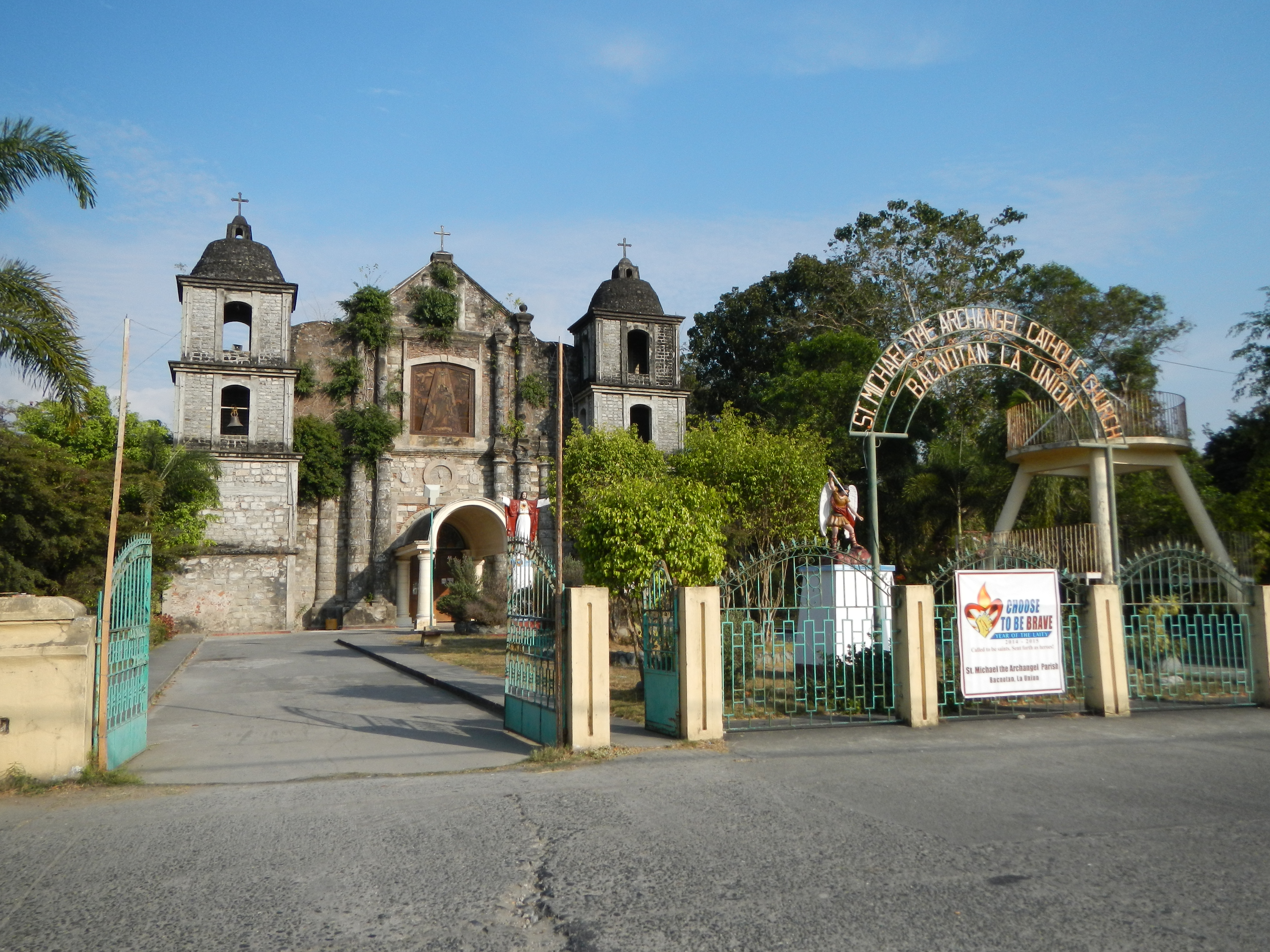
Saint Michael the Archangel Parish Church

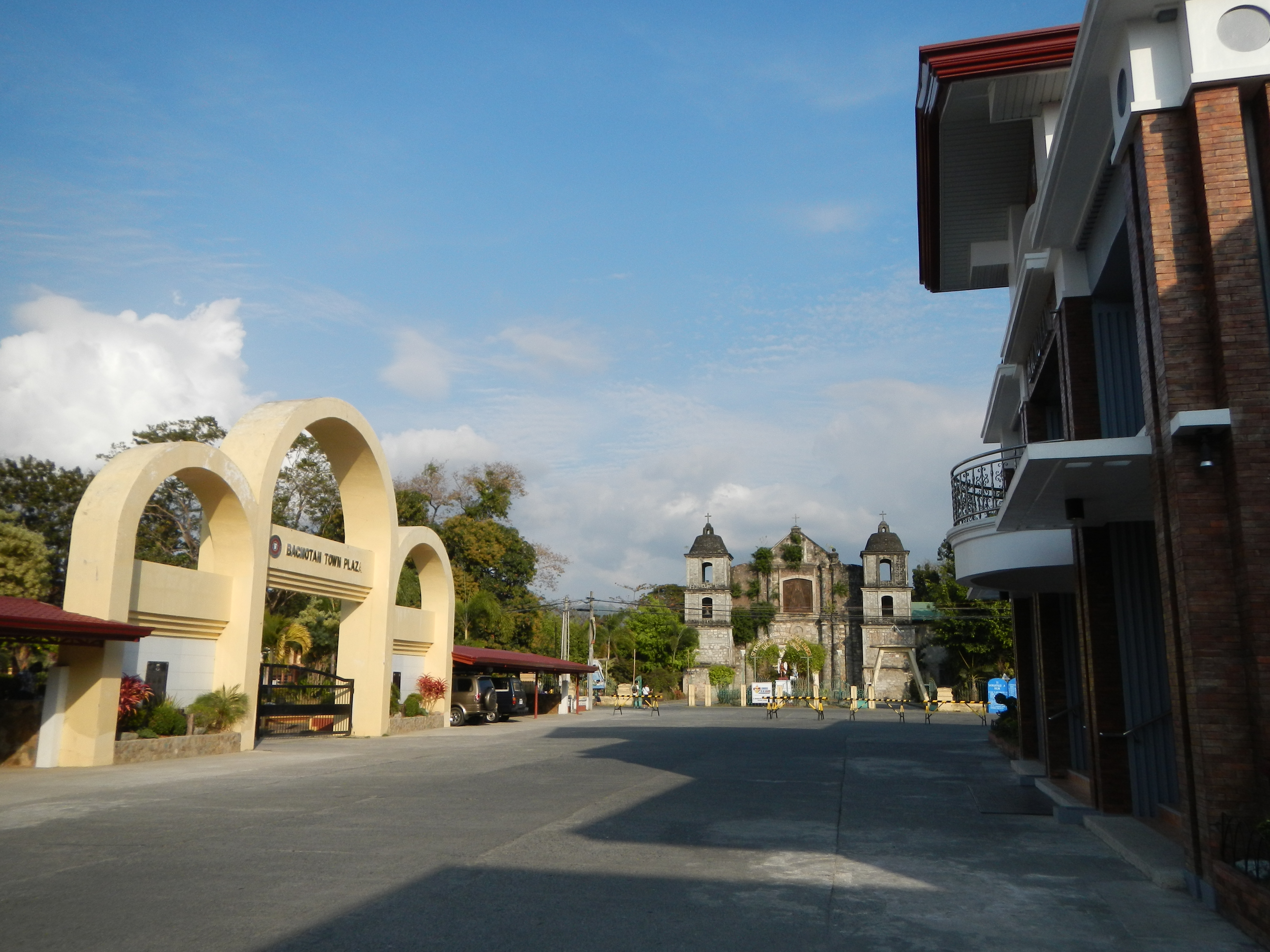
Street view
