= Erlinda Fadera-Basilio =

Filipino diplomat (born 1944)

Erlinda Fadera Basilio
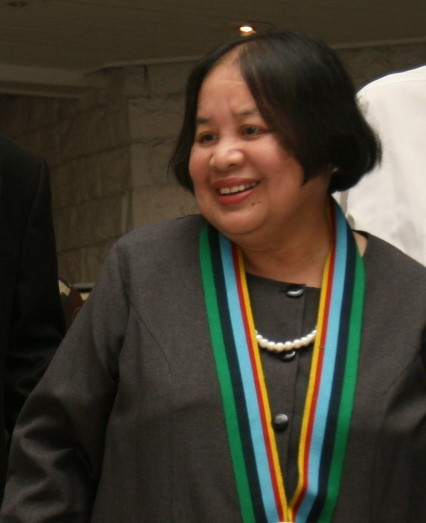
- Born: 1944 (age 81–82); Bacnotan, La Union, Philippines
- Education: University of the Philippines - Diliman
- Occupation: Diplomat
- Known for: Ambassador to the People's Republic of China

Erlinda Fadera-Basilio (born 1944) is a Philippine diplomat who has been the Ambassador of the Philippines to China.

She was born in Bacnotan, La Union, Philippines in 1944. She was educated at the University of the Philippines-Diliman. Her first degree was in Political Science and she also took a master's degree in Asian studies.

She became a diplomat around 1970. She spent eight years in Japan rising to consul-general, followed by another eight years in Cuba.

She was Assistant Secretary of Foreign Affairs for Asia and Pacific Affairs from 1995 to 1997; Ambassador to Sweden, Denmark, Norway, Estonia, Latvia and Lithuania from 1997 to 2003; Undersecretary of Foreign Affairs for Policy from 2006 to 2007 and from 2010 to 2011; Permanent Representative to the United Nations in Geneva from 2007 to 2010; Acting Secretary of Foreign Affairs; and later Head of the Foreign Service Institute.

On 5 December 2012, Philippine president Benigno Aquino III chose her as Ambassador to the People's Republic of China, the Democratic People's Republic of Korea, and Mongolia.
