= Dalandan =

Small citrus fruit

Dalandan, commonly named the sour orange to differentiate from other species, is a fruit. Dalandan grows on the Citrus nobilis, as the fruit is described as a hybrid between the Pomelo and the Mandarin orange. The fruit originated in Southeast Asia, until the 16th century when American explorers introduced the fruit to the Philippines, and it became widespread globally. Dalandan is used for health and culinary uses, such as weight loss, skin protection, and eyesight loss, and in the culinary sense as a condiment and a fruit paired with meals.

== Description ==
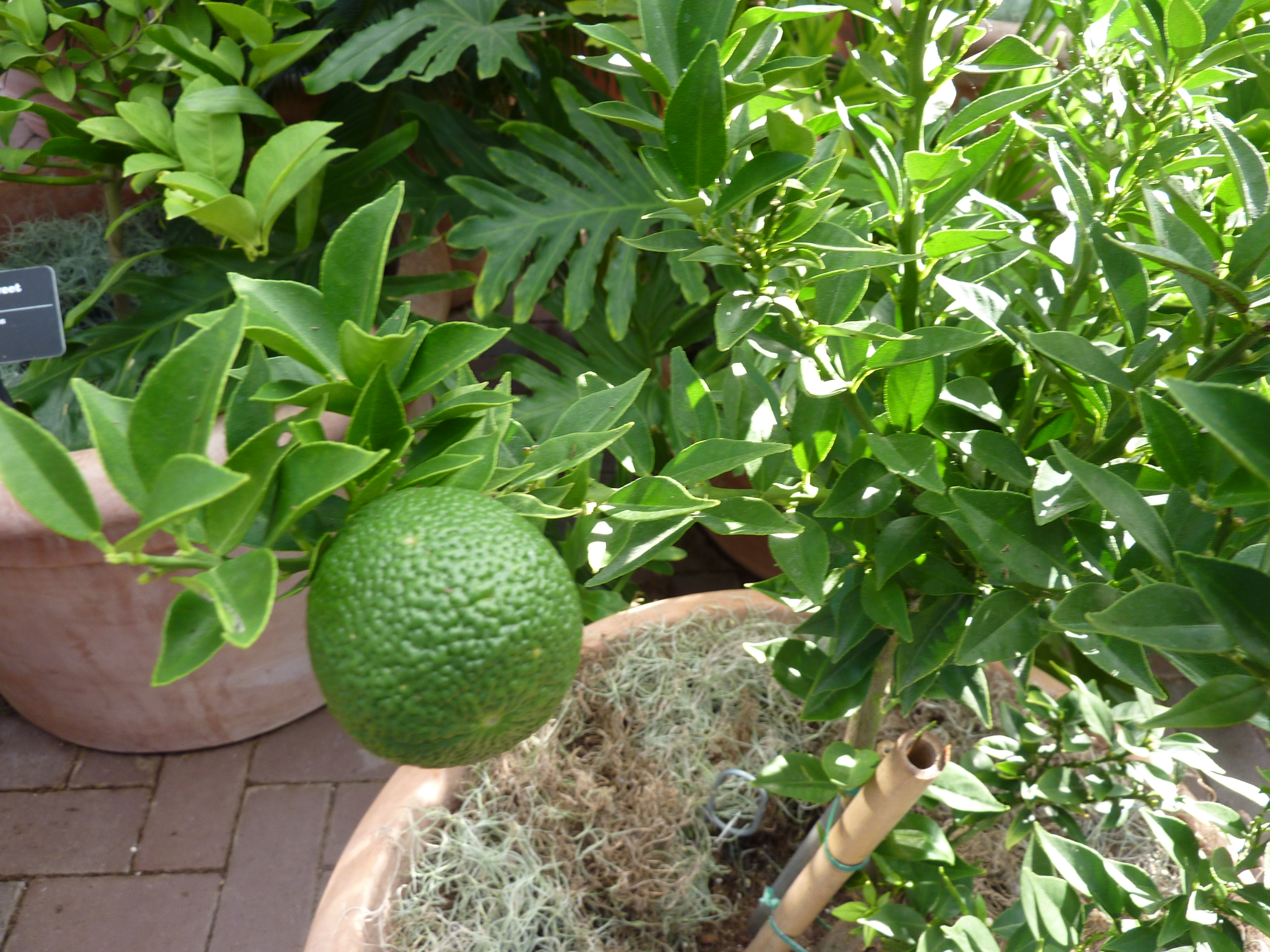
The dalandan, pictured.

The dalandan tree is small, with green shoots and small white flowers. The leaves are oval, with a greenish color, with a length of 10 cm (3.9 in) and a width of 4 cm (1.6 in). A dalandan is generally thought to be a cross from the Pomelo and Mandarin orange fruits. The dalandan has a green or sometimes a red-orange skin which, when a person peels its skin off, reveals a fruit which generally looks like an orange. While it is regularly sweet, the fruit has a sour taste. The dalandan also contains yellowish juice sacks. The fruit has a size of 5 to 9 cm (2.0 to 3.5 in) in diameter.

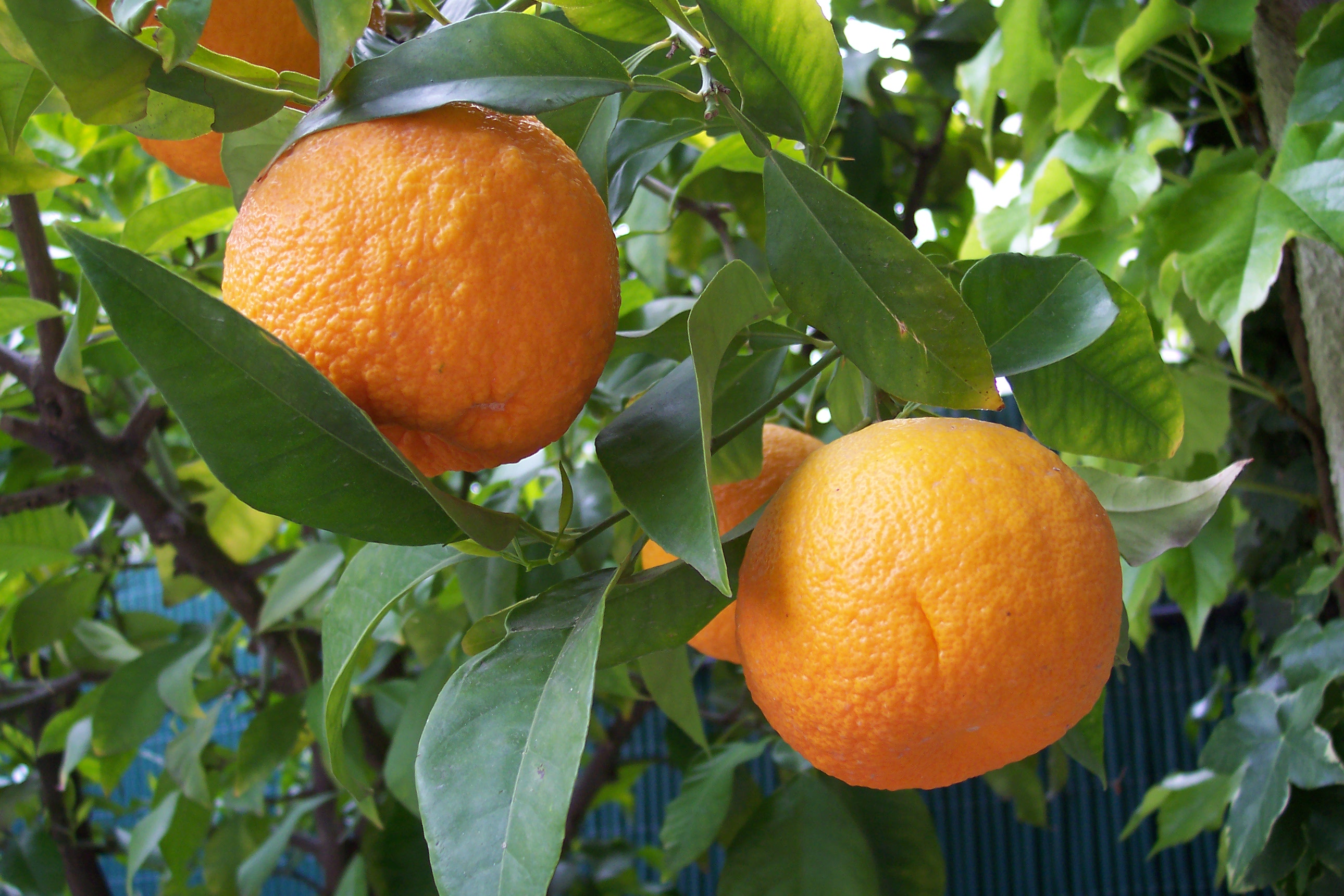
The citrus aurantium, where the fruit originates.

== History ==
The dalandan is ancient to Southeast Asia. In the 16th century, American explorers introduced the fruit to the Philippines, making the dalandan grow suit to the warmer climates. The dalandan eventually spread, making the fruit easily available through the entire nation. In 1912, the dalandan spread to Batangas. The fruit quickly spread, designating Batangas as the "dalandan capital of the Philippines". The craze eventually ended, with Batangas delisted as the "dalandan capital of the Philippines".

== Composition ==
In every 100 grams (0.22 pounds), there are regularly 37 to 66 calories, with 9.7 to 15.2 g (0.34 to 0.54 oz) of carbohydrates. In these carbohydrates, it includes 0.5 g (0.018 oz) of fiber, and some natural sugars regularly found in fruits, specifically in their fructose. The dalandan contains at least 1 g (0.035 oz) of protein. One serving can give you 45 to 90 mg (0.69 to 1.39 gr) of Vitamin C. The dalandan also contains some Calcium and Vitamin A. The dalandan is composed of 4% Citric acid, 4% Volatile acid, 4% Geraniol, 12% Camphene, 0.3% Anthranilic acid, 6.35% Linalyl acetate, and 6% Pectin.

== Cultivars ==
=== Dalanghita (Mandarin orange) ===
The dalanghita is sometimes compared to the dalandan, with a striking similarity between the two. The only difference is the type, from which the dalanghita is the Citrus nobilis, which produces the Mandarin orange, and the dalandan is from the C. × aurantium, which produces the Bitter orange, a fruit to which the dalandan is related.

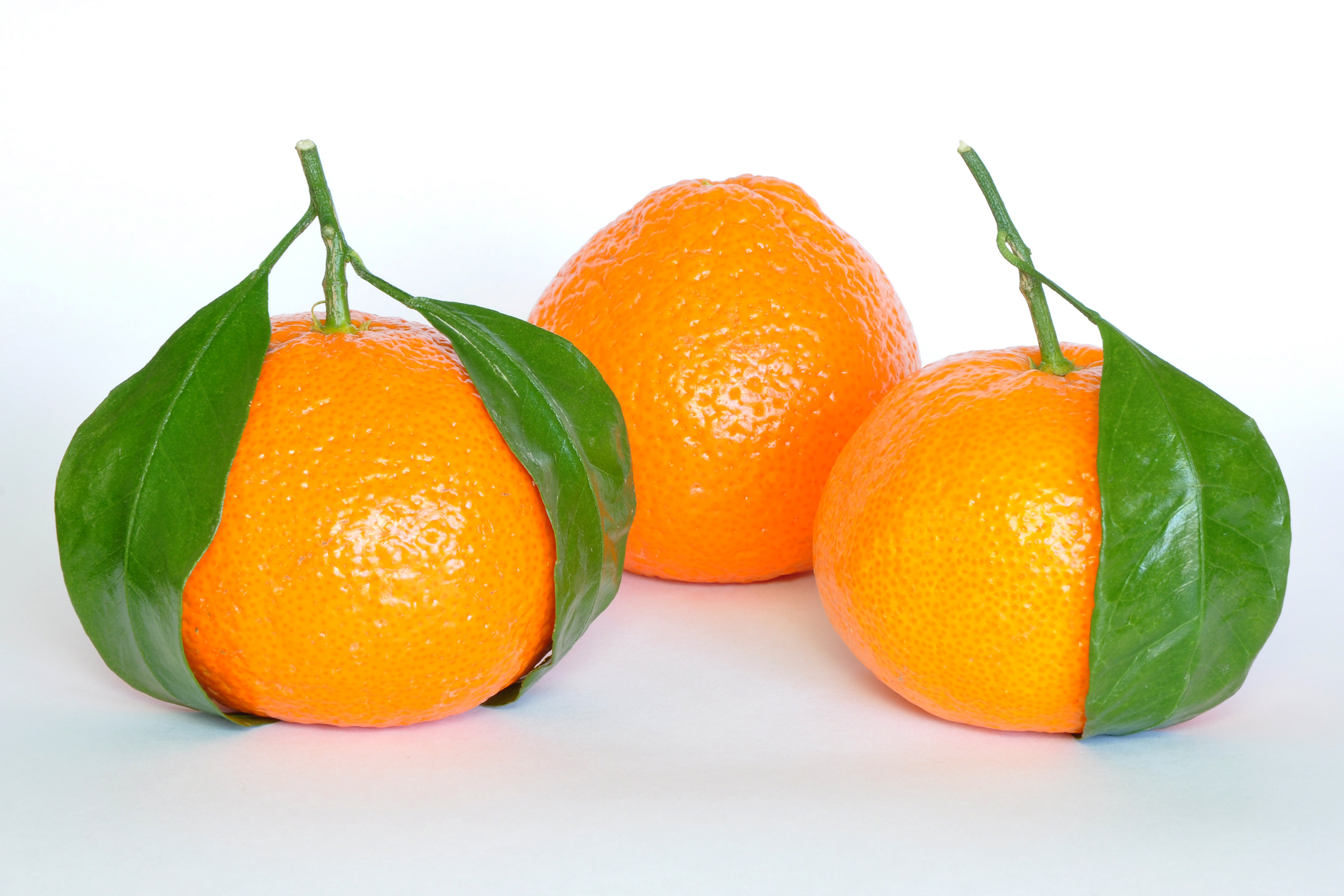
A mandarin orange, commonly known in the Philippines as the dalanghita. The mandarin orange is related to the dalandan.

== Pests and diseases ==
=== Diseases ===
Even though the dalandan can help health, the fruit can increase Photosensitivity. Taking coffee with dalandan can also increase your blood pressure.

== Use ==
=== Health ===
Dalandans are regularly used in weight reduction. In some studies, the dalandan was found to increase Thermogenesis, which helps get rid of some weight. The dalandan is also found to help improve skin health with the Vitamin C and antibacterial properties. The fruit can also cure Athlete's foot. The dalandan can also get rid of Constipation by stimulating the peristaltic motion with good fiber. The dalandan can get rid of bad eyesight by the presence of flavonoids, which improves vision health.

=== Culinary ===
The dalandan has multiple particular uses in culinary. The dried flowers of a dalandan are a good flavoring agent. The dalandan is used as a condiment or fruit of a specific meal. The flowers are also used in scenting tea. The oil from the dried fruit is used for food flavoring too. The fruit rind of the dalandan is used for baking to add more flavor. In Iran, the peel is used to flavor rice and other vegetables.
