= List of barangays in La Union =

The province of La Union has 576 barangays comprising its 19 municipalities and 1 city.

== Barangays ==
Most populous in its respective city/municipality (as of 2010)

Barangay	Population					City or municipality
Barangay	2010	2007	2000	1995	1990	City or municipality
Abut	511	501	427	407	387	San Fernando
Acao	4,233	3,981	3,985	3,348	3,161	Bauang
Agdeppa	1,148	1,110	976	885	868	Bangar
Agpay	692	695	576	514	472	Burgos
Agtipal	514	493	451	421	376	Bacnotan
Aguioas	934	911	890	841	773	Naguilian
Al-alinao Norte	1,293	1,103	1,092	1,088	1,004	Naguilian
Al-alinao Sur	843	883	962	889	766	Naguilian
Alaska	891	894	762	664	1,452	Aringay
Alcala (Poblacion)	825	724	745	773	746	Luna
Alibangsay	1,112	962	1,053	857	749	Bagulin
Alipang	928	865	838	816	798	Rosario
Allangigan	191	189	170	189	157	San Juan
Almeida	1,383	1,398	1,316	1,156	1,092	Balaoan
Aludaid	638	648	592	537	443	San Juan
Alzate	1,198	1,034	890	705	630	Bangar
Amallapay	1,878	1,893	1,703	1,779	1,500	Tubao
Ambalite	887	937	760	693	606	Pugo
Ambangonan	928	1,786	766	614	601	Pugo
Ambangonan	497	446	426	387	341	Rosario
Ambaracao Norte	1,533	1,455	1,511	1,443	1,290	Naguilian
Ambaracao Sur	772	666	738	644	589	Naguilian
Ambitacay	789	807	678	629	562	Agoo
Ambitacay	581	606	549	480	480	Santo Tomas
Amlang	2,088	1,974	1,722	1,473	1,398	Rosario
Amontoc	1,818	1,699	1,567	1,421	1,286	San Gabriel
Anduyan	1,718	1,822	1,472	1,450	1,213	Tubao
Angin	731	729	745	641	656	Naguilian
Antonino	768	897	864	925	–	Balaoan
Apaleng	458	454	472	442	424	San Fernando
Apatut	774	746	665	547	583	Balaoan
Apayao	878	771	943	834	842	San Gabriel
Ar-arampang	854	887	770	730	579	Balaoan
Arosip	453	348	396	370	342	Bacnotan
Ayaoan	665	663	648	624	558	Luna
Baay	1,004	906	843	714	634	Bagulin
Bacani	1,285	1,153	959	878	668	Rosario
Baccuit Norte	2,244	2,221	1,979	1,742	1,613	Bauang
Baccuit Sur	2,095	2,170	1,867	1,599	1,452	Bauang
Bacqui	468	514	405	358	364	Bacnotan
Bacsayan	754	634	619	575	511	San Juan
Bacsil	719	658	561	535	476	Bacnotan
Bacsil	607	564	559	470	449	San Fernando
Bagbag	1,121	882	1,127	1,022	870	Bauang
Bagutot	210	196	206	187	179	Bacnotan
Bail	2,227	2,185	1,962	1,818	1,694	Santo Tomas
Balaoc	1,373	1,157	1,095	1,095	1,071	Santo Tomas
Balawarte	1,550	1,429	1,207	971	1,172	Agoo
Balbalayang	648	554	571	555	524	San Gabriel
Balballosa	475	447	390	344	388	San Juan
Balecbec	824	747	803	650	650	Naguilian
Ballay	1,608	1,611	1,460	1,333	1,204	Bauang
Ballogo	920	998	653	530	517	Bacnotan
Balsaan	875	770	685	683	649	Santo Tomas
Bambanay	499	530	488	474	437	San Juan
Bancagan	1,231	1,218	996	907	814	Naguilian
Bangaoilan East	1,049	997	953	879	831	Bangar
Bangaoilan West	865	890	825	647	713	Bangar
Bangar	916	746	685	443	450	Rosario
Bangbangolan	590	536	392	421	410	San Fernando
Bangcusay	1,339	1,160	1,089	938	893	San Fernando
Bani	1,554	1,517	1,284	1,034	939	Rosario
Baracbac Este	991	1,043	991	936	905	Balaoan
Baracbac Oeste	367	353	319	322	291	Balaoan
Barangay I (Poblacion)	2,192	2,392	2,280	2,489	2,244	San Fernando
Barangay II (Poblacion)	475	592	674	693	856	San Fernando
Barangay III (Poblacion)	294	426	449	615	645	San Fernando
Barangay IV (Poblacion)	805	935	870	1,125	1,206	San Fernando
Barangobong	907	875	846	781	812	Luna
Baraoas	980	965	794	606	698	San Fernando
Baraoas Norte	866	805	737	673	576	Naguilian
Baraoas Sur	3,153	3,097	2,553	2,094	1,659	Naguilian
Bariquir	1,761	1,713	1,408	1,182	1,046	Naguilian
Baroro	2,489	2,348	2,040	1,827	1,679	Bacnotan
Barraca	1,154	1,158	1,168	1,081	1,004	Bangar
Barrientos	1,803	1,828	1,607	1,560	1,507	Luna
Basca	2,050	1,843	1,838	1,850	1,269	Aringay
Bato	1,530	1,397	1,351	1,331	1,131	Naguilian
Bato	989	898	784	741	719	San Fernando
Bautista	1,071	2,224	880	790	579	Caba
Bawanta	998	995	818	811	715	Bauang
Bayabas	513	424	442	443	430	San Gabriel
Baybay	1,415	1,338	1,310	1,303	1,226	Santo Tomas
Benteng-Sapilang	1,187	896	1,010	860	807	Rosario
Bet-ang	669	629	620	575	710	Balaoan
Biday	3,317	2,685	2,292	1,972	1,695	San Fernando
Bigbiga	1,133	998	940	1,017	906	Sudipen
Bilis	1,096	1,073	934	809	608	Burgos
Bimmotobot	1,031	1,002	885	860	754	Naguilian
Birunget	464	446	435	347	359	San Fernando
Bitalag	1,562	1,489	1,286	1,162	1,096	Bacnotan
Boy-utan	1,177	1,099	1,004	704	967	Bauang
Bucao	1,731	1,697	1,418	1,122	1,156	San Gabriel
Bucayab	1,279	1,212	1,172	951	972	Bauang
Bugbugcao	643	569	527	458	478	San Juan
Bulala	1,219	1,145	1,079	851	886	Bacnotan
Bulalaan	621	653	593	659	526	Sudipen
Bulbulala	1,569	1,502	1,343	1,189	1,153	Balaoan
Bumbuneg	2,187	2,183	2,052	1,922	1,776	San Gabriel
Bungol	1,419	1,329	1,268	1,109	1,072	Balaoan
Bungro	444	443	460	382	409	Luna
Bungro	1,272	1,237	1,086	967	879	San Fernando
Burayoc	395	351	297	249	236	Bacnotan
Buselbusel	1,119	1,119	1,105	985	886	Luna
Bussaoit	634	659	585	497	431	Bacnotan
Butubut Este	800	775	702	681	667	Balaoan
Butubut Norte	1,193	1,177	887	912	828	Balaoan
Butubut Oeste	698	682	576	543	517	Balaoan
Butubut Sur	702	778	789	696	654	Balaoan
Caarusipan	279	272	231	214	182	San Juan
Cabalayangan	1,537	1,572	1,508	1,489	1,476	Bauang
Cabalitocan	1,037	1,016	938	942	793	Luna
Cabaritan Norte	540	504	474	448	405	Naguilian
Cabaritan Sur	1,947	1,836	1,560	1,501	1,407	Naguilian
Cabaroan	1,751	1,629	1,363	1,167	995	Bacnotan
Cabaroan	1,312	1,257	1,170	1,003	1,012	San Juan
Cabaroan (Negro)	3,405	3,341	2,809	2,396	2,046	San Fernando
Cabarsican	1,103	1,040	828	728	660	Bacnotan
Cabarsican	423	382	359	289	238	San Fernando
Cabaruan	1,454	1,320	1,307	1,362	1,149	Santo Tomas
Cabisilan	693	659	476	440	340	Bauang
Cabuaan Oeste (Poblacion)	1,066	1,049	941	943	1,823	Balaoan
Cabugao	477	426	408	374	322	Bacnotan
Cabugnayan	835	818	824	744	589	San Juan
Cacapian	1,105	1,131	962	924	891	San Juan
Caculangan	461	387	363	353	310	San Juan
Cadaclan	1,446	1,352	1,168	1,028	983	San Fernando
Cadapli	1,361	1,423	1,296	1,120	1,037	Bangar
Cadumanian	1,033	927	871	792	725	Rosario
Caggao	170	141	103	108	76	Bangar
Calabugao	447	495	428	406	400	San Fernando
Calautit	690	636	556	526	472	Bacnotan
Calincamasan	930	884	858	735	751	San Juan
Calliat	1,301	1,127	1,008	964	898	Balaoan
Calumbaya	2,381	2,273	2,330	2,074	1,911	Bauang
Calungbuyan	1,422	1,497	1,276	1,118	1,047	Balaoan
Camansi	871	798	858	571	559	San Fernando
Cambaly	1,691	1,832	1,927	1,763	1,510	Bagulin
Camiling	1,081	1,051	808	896	767	Balaoan
Camp One	2,823	2,591	2,302	1,529	1,858	Rosario
Canaoay	1,610	1,541	1,345	1,196	1,088	San Fernando
Cantoria No. 1	500	490	511	440	427	Luna
Cantoria No. 2	773	803	750	666	658	Luna
Cantoria No. 3	753	705	642	567	474	Luna
Cantoria No. 4	558	429	458	439	407	Luna
Caoayan	455	556	411	329	361	Burgos
Caoigue	1,220	1,082	1,099	914	870	Tubao
Capas	941	968	798	712	597	Agoo
Carcarmay	543	564	504	492	402	Bacnotan
Cardiz	1,350	1,182	1,281	1,275	1,099	Bagulin
Cares	1,900	3,546	1,241	1,199	985	Pugo
Carisquis	701	646	594	503	482	Luna
Carlatan	2,443	3,024	2,778	2,884	2,775	San Fernando
Carmay	466	453	433	376	339	Bauang
Carunuan East	1,425	1,419	1,178	1,077	921	Rosario
Carunuan West	1,297	1,336	1,221	1,019	847	Rosario
Casantaan	1,991	1,820	1,630	1,428	1,159	Santo Tomas
Casiaman	867	790	727	690	659	Bacnotan
Casilagan	1,085	1,127	1,055	994	903	Bauang
Casilagan	1,896	2,004	1,999	1,878	1,615	Naguilian
Casilagan	587	579	576	489	404	Rosario
Casilagan	804	782	630	564	514	San Juan
Casilagan	1,557	1,592	1,391	1,115	1,269	Santo Tomas
Castro	1,578	1,425	1,332	1,254	1,139	Sudipen
Cataguingtingan	2,528	2,505	2,126	1,826	1,571	Rosario
Catbangen	9,857	9,717	8,267	8,707	8,159	San Fernando
Catdongan	460	459	389	354	346	San Juan
Central East (Poblacion)	4,249	4,204	3,652	3,467	3,313	Bauang
Central East No. 1 (Poblacion)	478	503	435	450	424	Bangar
Central East No. 2 (Poblacion)	1,087	994	1,088	973	1,007	Bangar
Central West (Poblacion)	3,951	3,622	3,466	3,526	3,080	Bauang
Central West No. 1 (Poblacion)	514	527	480	498	500	Bangar
Central West No. 2 (Poblacion)	586	657	639	626	546	Bangar
Central West No. 3 (Poblacion)	612	633	612	584	527	Bangar
Concepcion	3,206	2,937	2,172	1,850	1,617	Rosario
Consolacion (Poblacion)	1,662	1,598	1,434	1,473	1,305	Agoo
Consuegra	1,334	1,243	1,192	1,151	943	Bangar
Corrooy	2,136	2,176	2,066	1,899	1,773	Santol
Cuenca	1,713	1,774	1,615	1,519	1,276	Pugo
Cupang	1,398	1,324	1,223	1,018	934	Santo Tomas
Dagup	2,107	2,049	1,934	1,745	1,708	Bagulin
Daking	924	928	848	793	715	San Gabriel
Dal-lipaoen	1,746	1,686	1,737	1,548	1,481	Naguilian
Dalacdac	288	263	232	263	170	Burgos
Dallangayan Este	1,281	1,192	735	824	812	San Fernando
Dallangayan Oeste	1,746	1,856	1,495	1,194	912	San Fernando
Dalumpinas Este	1,373	1,252	1,204	864	722	San Fernando
Dalumpinas Oeste	1,466	1,970	1,683	1,202	1,051	San Fernando
Damortis	2,352	2,191	2,021	1,697	1,597	Rosario
Damortis	2,265	2,519	2,102	2,082	2,056	Santo Tomas
Dangdangla	902	824	784	709	683	San Juan
Daramuangan	1,015	967	890	869	747	Naguilian
Darigayos	1,466	1,621	1,465	1,260	1,120	Luna
Dasay	653	664	579	546	441	San Juan
Delles	1,450	1,343	1,226	1,114	955	Burgos
Dili	1,674	1,924	1,570	1,448	1,249	Bauang
Dinanum	706	623	566	468	419	San Juan
Disso-or	946	826	765	686	620	Bauang
Dr. Camilo Osias Poblacion (Cabuaan Este)	1,812	1,784	1,768	1,512	1,530	Balaoan
Dulao	3,284	3,045	2,865	2,510	2,439	Aringay
Duplas	604	577	526	502	469	Pugo
Duplas	591	575	531	532	514	San Juan
Duplas	1,007	955	945	930	851	Sudipen
Fernando	1,003	1,017	888	776	723	Santo Tomas
Francia Sur	1,587	1,519	1,281	1,183	1,164	Tubao
Francia West	1,467	1,632	1,315	1,131	1,153	Tubao
Gallano	1,014	885	926	915	910	Aringay
Galongen	982	1,003	963	943	883	Bacnotan
Gana	2,327	2,367	2,139	1,990	1,795	Caba
Garcia	1,536	1,492	1,461	1,514	1,389	Tubao
General Prim East	834	849	835	774	663	Bangar
General Prim West	1,491	1,466	1,300	1,180	1,097	Bangar
General Terrero	939	867	729	649	564	Bangar
Gonzales	1,412	1,645	1,583	1,472	1,341	Tubao
Guerrero	967	974	890	754	639	Bauang
Guesset	1,265	1,193	1,182	1,051	922	Naguilian
Guinabang	872	870	865	781	644	Bacnotan
Guinaburan	811	759	786	663	635	Balaoan
Guinguinabang	528	543	480	465	472	San Juan
Gumot-Nagcolaran	1,695	1,495	1,440	1,237	1,176	Rosario
Gusing Norte	1,525	1,714	1,664	1,562	1,404	Naguilian
Gusing Sur	1,542	1,106	1,100	1,140	898	Naguilian
Halog East	859	826	1,043	849	695	Tubao
Halog West	1,314	1,343	1,267	1,163	1,132	Tubao
Ili Norte (Poblacion)	2,458	2,001	2,222	2,045	1,645	San Juan
Ili Sur (Poblacion)	2,356	2,342	2,319	2,058	1,746	San Juan
Ilocano	877	831	757	667	668	Sudipen
Ilocanos Norte	1,372	1,518	1,479	1,430	1,558	San Fernando
Ilocanos Sur	2,721	3,123	3,035	3,036	3,548	San Fernando
Imelda	322	349	313	318	284	Burgos
Imelda	1,415	1,338	1,254	1,058	1,191	Naguilian
Inabaan Norte	1,769	1,439	1,427	1,210	1,053	Rosario
Inabaan Sur	1,312	1,174	1,192	1,112	1,095	Rosario
Ipet	1,571	1,512	1,376	1,235	1,048	Sudipen
Juan Cartas	741	670	643	673	617	Caba
Lacong	1,314	1,417	1,341	1,188	1,103	San Gabriel
Langcuas	1,667	1,476	1,208	833	779	San Fernando
Las-ud	1,231	1,096	1,174	1,000	915	Caba
Legleg	537	534	521	482	413	Bacnotan
Legleg	565	549	482	470	435	San Juan
Leones East	1,440	1,376	1,297	1,211	1,037	Tubao
Leones West	1,383	1,344	1,213	1,168	1,008	Tubao
Lettac Norte	1,072	918	889	821	783	Santol
Lettac Sur	1,067	1,057	955	954	868	Santol
Libbo	785	671	736	668	540	Bagulin
Libtong	543	1,035	466	366	433	Burgos
Linapew	1,281	1,264	1,121	1,043	962	Tubao
Lingsat	7,019	7,545	7,167	6,639	5,703	San Fernando
Linong	634	569	529	412	372	Santo Tomas
Linuan	399	398	345	272	232	Burgos
Lioac Norte	1,465	1,424	1,276	1,205	1,003	Naguilian
Lioac Sur	1,226	1,013	1,019	1,009	819	Naguilian
Lipay Este	482	432	413	377	378	San Gabriel
Lipay Norte	579	554	553	475	463	San Gabriel
Lipay Proper	374	307	349	341	301	San Gabriel
Lipay Sur	879	706	608	581	499	San Gabriel
Liquicia	1,155	1,073	1,105	1,006	812	Caba
Lisqueb	854	831	741	707	611	Bacnotan
Lloren	3,277	3,051	2,771	2,433	2,228	Tubao
Lomboy	1,319	1,403	1,250	1,108	961	Santo Tomas
Lon-oy	715	635	709	707	647	San Gabriel
Lower San Agustin	1,123	1,065	912	886	816	Bauang
Lower Tumapoc	384	327	301	278	258	Burgos
Lubing	878	888	736	634	619	San Juan
Luzong Norte	1,276	1,208	1,136	1,030	948	Bangar
Luzong Sur	901	856	906	797	755	Bangar
Mabanengbeng 1st	323	275	245	254	243	Bacnotan
Mabanengbeng 2nd	339	300	278	248	258	Bacnotan
Macabato	1,235	1,200	1,158	1,019	1,010	Aringay
Macalva Central	615	617	567	490	502	Agoo
Macalva Norte	1,095	1,053	954	787	772	Agoo
Macalva Sur	1,332	1,262	1,138	1,036	922	Agoo
Madayegdeg	1,830	1,768	1,722	1,449	1,302	San Fernando
Magallanes (Poblacion)	1,934	1,835	1,643	1,576	1,317	Luna
Magsaysay	1,458	1,415	1,279	1,001	870	Tubao
Magsiping	850	792	783	684	597	Luna
Magungunay	858	717	863	717	695	Naguilian
Malabago	449	394	259	267	237	Santo Tomas
Maliclico	921	792	898	831	811	Sudipen
Mamat-ing Norte	719	690	674	765	723	Naguilian
Mamat-ing Sur	1,290	1,126	1,019	875	886	Naguilian
Mamay	357	306	325	318	350	Luna
Mameltac	1,372	1,410	957	873	717	San Fernando
Manga	1,465	1,336	1,215	1,034	853	Aringay
Mangaan	1,066	1,044	986	939	764	Santol
Maoasoas Norte	1,212	1,114	963	813	793	Pugo
Maoasoas Sur	973	919	827	569	473	Pugo
Maragayap	537	519	430	345	343	Bacnotan
Marcos	1,396	1,222	1,107	1,129	1,073	Rosario
Maria Cristina East	869	847	897	827	764	Bangar
Maria Cristina West	1,013	1,081	1,064	973	911	Bangar
Masicong	435	455	362	308	297	San Fernando
Masupe	943	913	838	752	816	Balaoan
Mindoro	1,570	1,451	1,486	1,346	1,233	Bangar
Nadsaag	765	798	753	655	584	San Juan
Nagatiran	645	589	601	594	561	Bacnotan
Nagrebcan	1,443	1,392	1,275	917	890	Bauang
Nagrebcan	885	791	754	726	722	Luna
Nagsabaran	1,335	1,232	1,096	838	786	Bangar
Nagsabaran	500	530	430	458	486	San Juan
Nagsabaran Norte	1,541	1,445	1,393	1,430	1,291	Balaoan
Nagsabaran Sur	1,023	1,033	951	918	731	Balaoan
Nagsaraboan	1,100	1,041	1,029	926	906	Bacnotan
Nagsidorisan	939	895	831	730	682	Naguilian
Nagsimbaanan	661	691	684	637	603	Bacnotan
Nagtagaan	1,632	1,562	1,409	1,390	1,193	Rosario
Naguirangan	689	606	626	585	541	San Juan
Naguituban	1,112	943	923	818	671	San Juan
Nagyubuyuban	1,226	1,226	1,143	790	792	San Fernando
Nagyubuyuban	424	375	382	285	286	San Juan
Nalasin	1,488	1,457	1,467	1,303	1,333	Balaoan
Nalvo Norte	1,240	1,112	936	931	841	Luna
Nalvo Sur	1,530	2,730	1,214	1,185	1,116	Luna
Namaltugan	914	931	829	665	743	Sudipen
Namboongan	2,214	1,930	1,976	1,669	1,854	Santo Tomas
Namonitan	2,050	1,787	1,353	942	791	Santo Tomas
Namtutan	772	517	622	502	453	San Fernando
Nangalisan	741	736	645	604	541	Bacnotan
Nancamotian	789	751	626	514	446	Rosario
Napaset	645	673	615	522	556	Balaoan
Napaset	1,256	1,259	1,285	1,199	1,117	Luna
Narra	1,203	1,113	1,035	1,012	873	Bacnotan
Narra Este	490	465	412	346	295	San Fernando
Narra Oeste	546	518	418	387	390	San Fernando
Narvacan	559	571	502	544	941	Santo Tomas
Natividad (Poblacion)	2,656	2,454	2,068	1,742	1,763	Naguilian
Nazareno	1,874	1,775	1,651	1,536	1,378	Agoo
New Poblacion	897	925	767	764	708	Burgos
Oaqui No. 1	532	544	521	485	460	Luna
Oaqui No. 2	362	331	307	308	261	Luna
Oaqui No. 3	632	637	588	590	577	Luna
Oaqui No. 4	699	762	716	713	705	Luna
Oaquing	314	299	307	266	264	San Juan
Old Central	1,281	1,294	1,139	931	956	Sudipen
Old Poblacion	492	507	469	456	420	Burgos
Ortega	873	721	752	738	651	Bacnotan
Ortiz (Poblacion)	2,665	2,412	2,570	2,479	2,450	Naguilian
Oya-oy	503	498	505	490	417	Bacnotan
Pa-o	595	601	510	480	454	Balaoan
Paagan	571	538	529	483	412	Bacnotan
Paagan	1,364	1,351	1,430	1,255	1,170	Santol
Pacpacac	430	416	414	319	320	San Juan
Pacpaco	911	863	793	762	781	San Fernando
Pagbennecan	876	804	742	656	639	Balaoan
Pagdalagan	3,221	3,164	2,710	2,383	1,983	San Fernando
Pagdalagan Sur	2,553	2,410	2,252	1,937	1,687	Bauang
Pagdaraoan	2,031	2,210	2,053	2,104	2,014	San Fernando
Pagdildilan	457	445	391	338	334	San Juan
Pagleddegan	647	661	626	582	534	Balaoan
Pagudpud	2,155	2,305	1,956	1,557	1,325	San Fernando
Palina	1,300	1,098	790	720	658	Pugo
Palintucang	973	965	772	732	634	Bauang
Palugsi-Limmansangan	1,357	1,512	1,339	1,248	1,110	Bauang
Pandan	1,142	1,043	973	862	729	Bacnotan
Pang-Pang	231	177	156	134	130	Bacnotan
Pangao-aoan East	1,221	1,088	1,130	984	904	Aringay
Pangao-aoan West	807	832	696	667	638	Aringay
Panicsican	1,242	1,189	947	845	786	San Juan
Pantar Norte	1,469	1,379	1,416	1,303	1,226	Balaoan
Pantar Sur	872	836	748	790	735	Balaoan
Pao Norte	662	596	579	595	619	San Fernando
Pao Sur	403	426	436	470	437	San Fernando
Paraoir	1,995	1,978	1,832	1,498	1,415	Balaoan
Parasapas	1,757	1,650	1,489	1,366	1,238	Rosario
Paratong No. 3	1,019	949	913	849	760	Bangar
Paratong No. 4	777	750	722	669	616	Bangar
Paratong Norte	1,508	1,388	1,256	1,066	929	Bangar
Parian	3,313	3,229	2,856	1,851	1,467	San Fernando
Parian Este	1,905	2,199	1,582	1,731	1,432	Bauang
Parian Oeste	1,141	1,090	871	815	744	Bauang
Paringao	3,850	3,644	3,827	3,264	3,230	Bauang
Patac	2,978	2,317	2,362	2,034	1,899	Santo Tomas
Patpata	1,381	1,234	1,038	1,036	945	Balaoan
Payocpoc Norte Este	1,212	1,082	914	865	796	Bauang
Payocpoc Norte Oeste	1,633	1,828	1,632	1,336	1,216	Bauang
Payocpoc Sur	2,528	2,810	2,196	1,656	1,723	Bauang
Pias	1,262	1,187	1,013	900	652	San Fernando
Pideg	1,447	1,352	1,294	1,252	1,173	Tubao
Pila	1,349	1,188	1,075	1,062	1,023	Luna
Pilar	379	467	812	922	675	Bauang
Pitpitac	667	625	589	519	489	Luna
Poblacion	3,464	3,660	3,311	2,959	2,828	Aringay
Poblacion	3,466	3,407	2,907	2,726	2,379	Bacnotan
Poblacion	2,743	2,793	2,312	2,117	1,963	San Gabriel
Poblacion	1,696	1,673	1,688	1,665	1,806	Santo Tomas
Poblacion	1,469	1,476	1,269	1,154	1,105	Santol
Poblacion	1,068	1,166	1,023	960	871	Sudipen
Poblacion	748	677	787	864	911	Tubao
Poblacion East	875	869	787	718	722	Pugo
Poblacion East	2,093	2,557	2,417	2,655	2,401	Rosario
Poblacion Norte	1,291	1,243	1,368	1,360	1,209	Caba
Poblacion Sur	957	885	940	887	806	Caba
Poblacion West	1,024	919	929	866	802	Pugo
Poblacion West	1,690	1,698	1,632	1,527	1,301	Rosario
Polipol	843	703	783	613	449	San Gabriel
Pongpong	1,504	1,437	1,449	1,289	1,326	Santo Tomas
Poro	6,626	5,956	5,231	5,356	4,606	San Fernando
Porporiket	834	716	685	680	621	Sudipen
Pottot	1,237	1,208	1,023	910	786	Bauang
Pudoc	1,455	1,488	1,246	1,059	939	Bauang
Pugo	2,703	2,633	2,178	1,696	1,547	Bauang
Puguil	1,096	1,141	1,140	959	966	Santol
Purok	617	630	619	677	588	Agoo
Puspus	475	415	471	411	449	San Fernando
Puzon	824	821	740	669	531	Rosario
Quidem	205	158	166	150	145	San Juan
Quinavite	3,417	3,464	2,946	2,760	2,170	Bauang
Quintarong	1,086	1,014	1,074	914	858	Bangar
Quirino	986	954	1,114	1,436	1,247	Bacnotan
Rabon	990	736	660	520	488	Rosario
Ramot	630	587	541	485	479	Santol
Raois	925	890	775	789	736	Bacnotan
Raois	1,046	954	981	955	1,039	Santo Tomas
Reyna Regente	1,028	904	875	788	690	Bangar
Ribsuan	972	774	839	816	659	Naguilian
Rimos No. 1	730	686	670	661	601	Luna
Rimos No. 2	544	475	554	498	485	Luna
Rimos No. 3	759	785	766	642	609	Luna
Rimos No. 4	798	831	824	780	752	Luna
Rimos No. 5	1,312	1,337	1,130	1,044	949	Luna
Rissing	2,279	2,308	1,959	1,958	1,623	Bangar
Rissing	401	354	313	278	264	Luna
Rizal	1,400	1,282	1,374	1,331	1,294	Tubao
Sablut	805	763	684	672	752	Balaoan
Sacyud	550	552	590	514	536	San Fernando
Sagayad	2,747	2,576	1,869	892	795	San Fernando
Salcedo (Poblacion)	1,026	798	987	877	936	Luna
Salincob	544	540	539	461	446	Bacnotan
Samara	2,487	2,339	2,290	1,998	1,931	Aringay
San Agustin	1,943	1,881	1,589	1,483	1,386	San Fernando
San Agustin East	2,322	2,323	1,804	1,563	1,424	Agoo
San Agustin Norte	1,240	1,130	959	864	747	Agoo
San Agustin Sur	1,210	1,106	1,192	1,151	982	Agoo
San Antonino	1,002	980	858	791	627	Agoo
San Antonio	2,209	2,193	1,839	1,820	1,431	Agoo
San Antonio	1,024	976	979	902	880	Aringay
San Antonio	897	804	719	655	528	Naguilian
San Benito Norte	2,428	2,256	2,021	1,782	1,340	Aringay
San Benito Sur	3,354	3,227	3,170	2,815	2,315	Aringay
San Blas	1,230	1,242	1,080	937	849	Bangar
San Carlos	1,361	1,074	984	1,011	916	Caba
San Cornelio	1,373	1,406	1,347	1,338	1,382	Caba
San Cristobal	743	735	725	613	563	Bangar
San Eugenio	3,682	3,699	3,441	3,056	2,801	Aringay
San Felipe	1,351	968	1,177	1,043	980	San Juan
San Fermin	1,111	1,083	1,022	998	906	Caba
San Francisco	1,026	956	833	707	654	Agoo
San Francisco	3,040	2,991	2,609	2,673	2,592	San Fernando
San Francisco Norte	469	479	521	491	429	Sudipen
San Francisco Sur	822	830	763	673	608	Sudipen
San Gregorio	996	947	955	838	863	Caba
San Isidro	1,895	1,699	1,487	1,387	1,208	Agoo
San Isidro	903	880	873	816	698	Naguilian
San Joaquin Norte	1,270	1,223	1,051	803	781	Agoo
San Joaquin Sur	1,436	1,467	1,345	1,176	959	Agoo
San Jose	2,295	1,983	2,089	1,999	1,831	Caba
San Jose	522	484	440	377	320	Rosario
San Jose	829	865	834	795	740	Sudipen
San Jose Norte	787	758	779	677	589	Agoo
San Jose Sur	1,667	1,363	1,376	1,311	1,142	Agoo
San Juan	1,126	1,113	1,089	1,007	889	Agoo
San Juan East	899	977	911	868	802	Aringay
San Juan West	1,182	1,105	1,073	903	915	Aringay
San Julian Central	613	588	577	539	494	Agoo
San Julian East	1,096	1,099	979	878	830	Agoo
San Julian Norte	739	680	603	588	562	Agoo
San Julian West	1,795	1,920	1,579	1,313	1,043	Agoo
San Luis	1,854	1,626	1,430	1,354	1,130	Pugo
San Manuel Norte	1,960	1,782	1,679	1,511	1,459	Agoo
San Manuel Sur	837	742	701	671	707	Agoo
San Marcos	1,849	1,969	1,730	1,490	1,316	Agoo
San Martin	798	818	724	678	559	Bacnotan
San Miguel	1,513	1,455	1,176	989	824	Agoo
San Nicolas Central (Poblacion)	1,020	1,068	1,095	1,068	960	Agoo
San Nicolas East	769	793	715	706	514	Agoo
San Nicolas Norte (Poblacion)	717	691	661	688	665	Agoo
San Nicolas Sur (Poblacion)	2,382	2,434	492	541	487	Agoo
San Nicolas West	535	601	2,112	1,885	1,658	Agoo
San Pablo	1,146	1,085	861	749	713	Balaoan
San Pedro	1,089	1,018	997	887	817	Agoo
San Roque East	793	834	870	907	739	Agoo
San Roque West	1,438	1,207	1,136	956	926	Agoo
San Simon East	1,051	868	808	838	761	Aringay
San Simon West	1,225	1,279	1,314	1,046	1,022	Aringay
San Vicente	2,407	2,370	2,144	1,793	1,559	San Fernando
San Vicente Norte	1,052	1,076	912	882	896	Agoo
San Vicente Sur	1,086	1,048	792	911	721	Agoo
Santa Ana	1,860	1,540	1,339	1,242	1,126	Agoo
Santa Barbara (Poblacion)	1,887	1,598	1,504	1,330	1,286	Agoo
Santa Cecilia	1,823	1,716	1,681	1,448	1,219	Aringay
Santa Cruz	1,212	1,194	1,074	993	886	Bacnotan
Santa Fe	845	743	732	725	527	Agoo
Santa Lucia	2,861	2,938	3,061	2,635	2,359	Aringay
Santa Maria	975	773	747	774	641	Agoo
Santa Monica	995	1,121	819	656	561	Agoo
Santa Monica	1,373	1,002	1,360	1,120	1,239	Bauang
Santa Rita	608	620	546	517	481	Bacnotan
Santa Rita (Nalinac)	1,546	1,390	1,176	1,077	985	Agoo
Santa Rita East	755	696	631	600	503	Agoo
Santa Rita East	1,078	1,081	1,042	881	831	Aringay
Santa Rita Norte	1,020	1,028	977	925	865	Agoo
Santa Rita Sur	1,088	989	944	818	815	Agoo
Santa Rita West	677	619	590	596	540	Agoo
Santa Rita West	3,192	3,048	2,794	2,378	1,615	Aringay
Santa Rosa	463	447	419	383	385	San Juan
Santa Teresa	1,568	1,387	1,413	1,281	1,198	Tubao
Santiago	3,373	3,399	2,602	2,198	1,974	Bauang
Santiago Norte	1,128	964	1,112	1,064	955	Caba
Santiago Norte	3,328	3,029	2,728	1,951	1,898	San Fernando
Santiago Sur	1,910	1,627	1,616	1,320	1,238	Caba
Santiago Sur	1,743	1,641	1,587	1,061	800	San Fernando
Santo Domingo Norte	1,413	1,500	1,427	1,245	1,191	Luna
Santo Domingo Sur	1,012	896	801	693	669	Luna
Santo Rosario	748	739	675	651	608	San Juan
Santo Rosario East	1,443	1,414	1,313	1,143	841	Aringay
Santo Rosario West	1,789	1,732	1,623	1,448	1,323	Aringay
Saoay	741	714	609	480	409	San Fernando
Sapdaan	445	400	388	337	302	Santol
Sapilang	878	858	854	918	892	Bacnotan
Saracat	533	493	463	432	431	San Juan
Sasaba	862	850	915	810	795	Santol
Sayoan	418	412	383	312	322	Bacnotan
Saytan	1,304	1,312	1,209	1,157	959	Pugo
Sengngat	1,319	1,135	1,065	1,003	957	Sudipen
Sevilla	10,612	10,990	9,619	8,503	7,362	San Fernando
Siboan-Otong	787	717	712	664	736	San Fernando
Sili	1,154	1,074	1,043	911	760	Naguilian
Sinapangan	504	434	404	381	356	San Juan
Sinapangan Norte	648	572	592	538	529	Balaoan
Sinapangan Norte	1,000	976	930	810	709	Bangar
Sinapangan Sur	1,128	976	870	842	815	Balaoan
Sinapangan Sur	758	778	776	687	680	Bangar
Sipulo	934	910	839	754	687	Bacnotan
Sobredillo	1,279	1,283	1,205	1,071	1,012	Caba
Subusub	2,586	2,423	2,142	2,217	1,978	Rosario
Sucoc Norte	532	528	487	439	454	Luna
Sucoc Sur	380	393	392	375	341	Luna
Suguidan Norte	793	711	814	809	772	Naguilian
Suguidan Sur	907	877	926	836	914	Naguilian
Suyo	598	606	584	530	554	Luna
Suyo (Poblacion)	1,603	1,438	1,590	1,389	1,118	Bagulin
Taberna	1,868	1,846	1,666	1,418	1,400	Bauang
Taboc	2,807	2,679	2,356	2,423	1,985	San Juan
Tabtabungao	2,460	2,592	1,925	1,536	1,370	Rosario
Tagudtud	978	804	802	716	623	Bagulin
Tallaoen	700	677	657	607	613	Luna
Tallipugo	1,028	956	906	932	807	Balaoan
Talogtog	1,681	1,591	1,123	1,079	896	San Juan
Tammocalao	1,263	1,239	1,060	920	778	Bacnotan
Tanglag	637	602	533	558	469	Rosario
Tanqui	4,907	5,318	4,889	4,398	4,455	San Fernando
Tanquigan	988	951	782	755	645	San Fernando
Tavora East	748	691	619	589	588	Pugo
Tavora Proper	1,196	1,097	980	867	877	Pugo
Tay-ac	2,362	2,207	1,802	1,418	1,533	Rosario
Tio-angan	917	1,729	775	781	700	Bagulin
Tococ	1,140	1,032	991	843	880	Santo Tomas
Tubaday	800	712	623	596	539	Santol
Tubod	2,485	2,274	2,221	1,901	1,720	Santo Tomas
Tuddingan	1,570	1,307	1,436	1,326	1,198	Naguilian
Turod	754	788	849	685	626	Sudipen
Ubagan	1,786	1,615	1,501	1,403	1,116	Santo Tomas
Ubbog	596	573	516	472	410	Bacnotan
Ubbog	1,310	1,124	1,075	962	862	Bangar
Udiao	2,214	2,236	1,928	1,655	1,387	Rosario
Up-uplas	533	579	550	599	543	Sudipen
Upper San Agustin	1,053	1,147	1,008	804	791	Bauang
Upper Tumapoc	832	790	708	603	509	Burgos
Urayong	1,455	1,381	1,403	1,151	950	Bauang
Urayong	658	664	646	615	545	Caba
Urbiztondo	1,850	1,826	1,525	1,289	1,005	San Juan
Victoria (Poblacion)	1,331	1,232	1,162	1,087	1,036	Luna
Vila	2,245	1,294	1,197	1,116	1,017	Rosario
Wallayan	1,043	948	916	872	737	Bagulin
Wenceslao	360	338	340	274	239	Caba
Zaragosa	551	565	528	454	435	Bacnotan
Barangay	2010	2007	2000	1995	1990	City or municipality
*Italicized names are former names.; *Dashes (–) in cells indicate unavailable census data.

[top]
