= San Gabriel, La Union =

Municipality in La Union, Philippines

San Gabriel Baka-Burnotan
- Municipality
- Municipality of San Gabriel
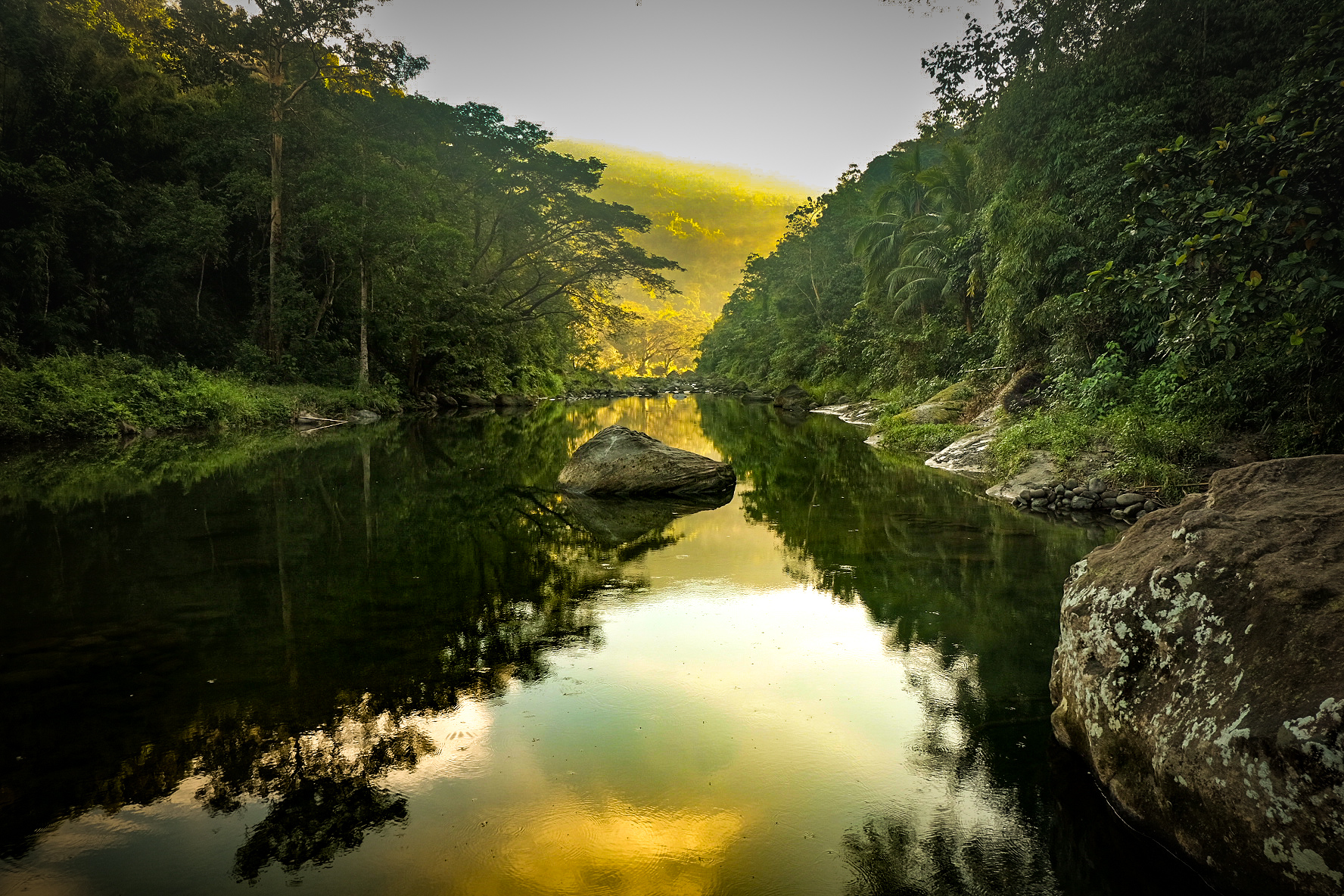
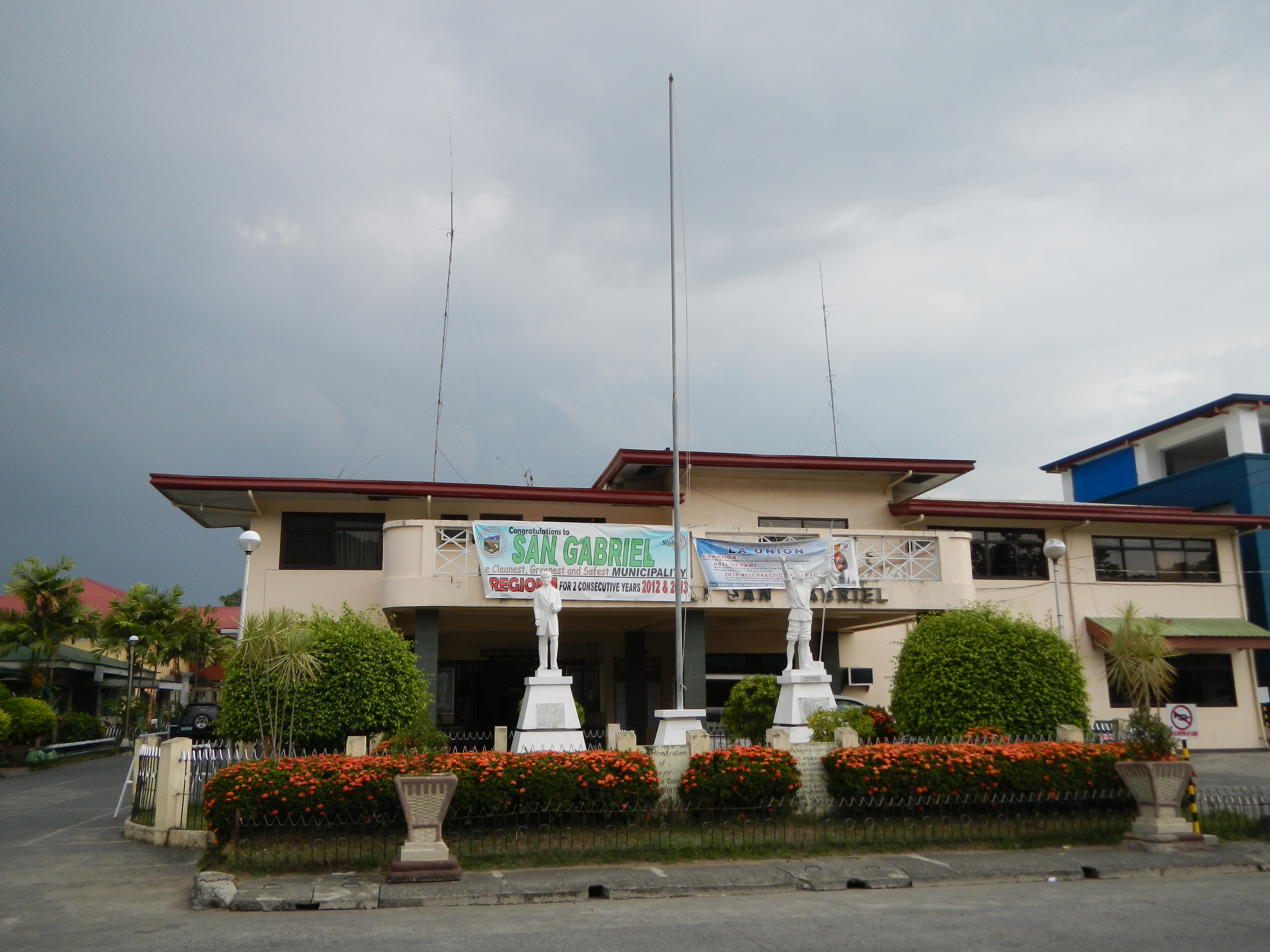
- San Gabriel River Basin & Municipal Hall

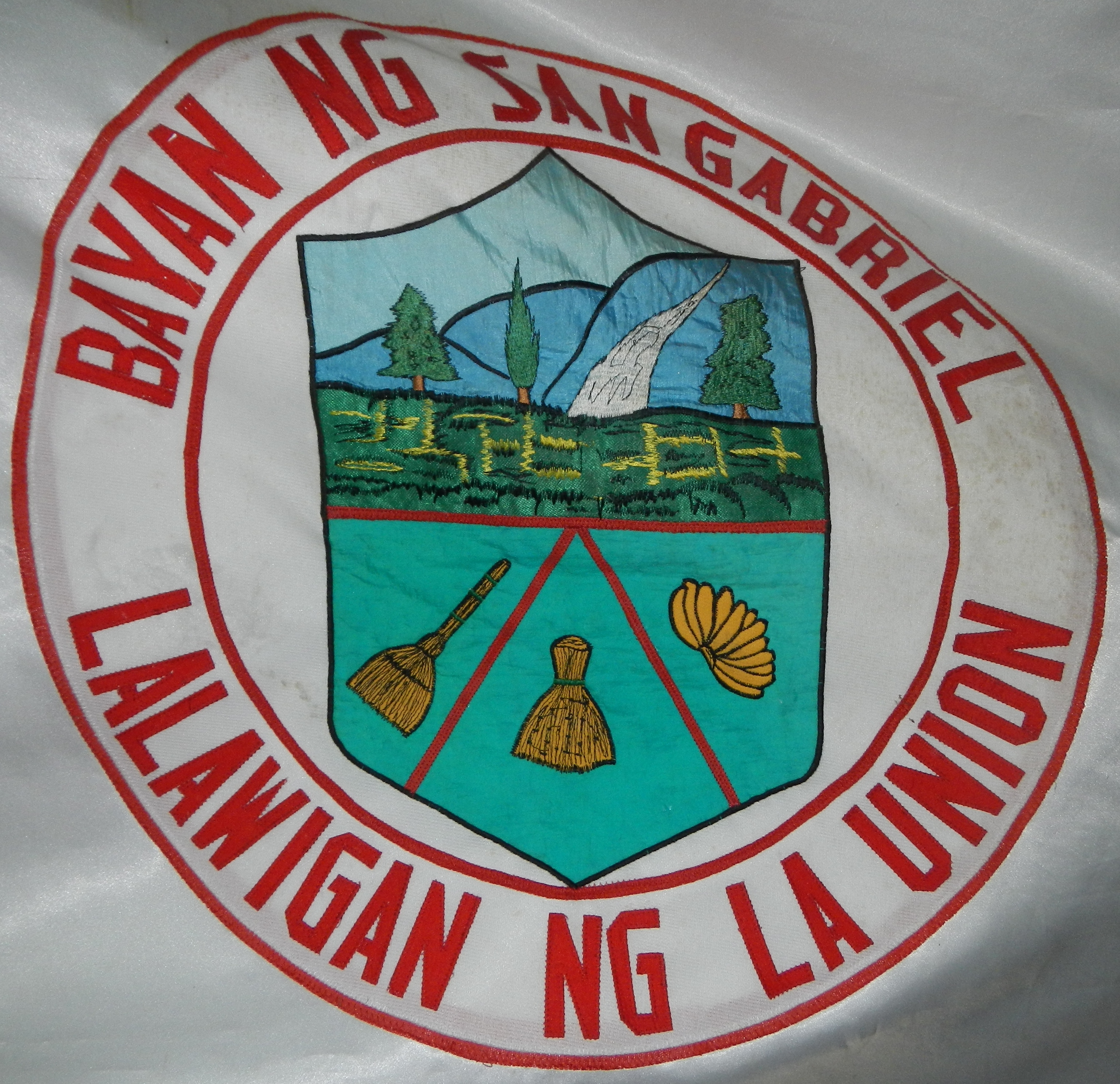
- Flag Seal
- Nicknames: The Softbroom Capital of the North; Highland Vegetable and Tourism Adventure Paradise of La Union
- Motto: San Gabriel, Mapangnamnamaan
- Anthem: San Gabriel Hymn
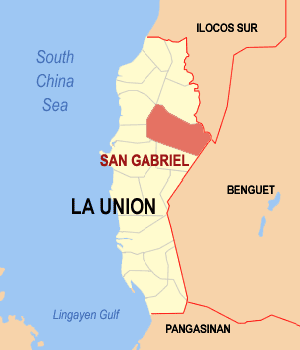
- Map of La Union with San Gabriel highlighted
- Interactive map of San Gabriel
- Location within the Philippines
- Coordinates: 16°40′N 120°24′E
- Country: Philippines
- Region: Ilocos Region
- Province: La Union
- District: 1st district
- Founded: 1947
- Named for: Saint Gabriel
- Barangays: 15 (see Barangays)

Government
  - Type: Sangguniang Bayan
  - Mayor: Lany B. Carbonell
  - Vice Mayor: Ramolito A. Guinomma
  - Representative: Francisco Paolo P. Ortega V
  - Municipal Council: Members: Mario P. Aligo; Jerry T. Fernandez; Geoffrey D. Awingan; Mardo A. Bang-oa; Isagani L. Domaoang; Mauricio P. Canutab; Dominador P. Abuan; Danilo A. Elias
  - Electorate: 13,308 voters (2025)

Area
  - Total: 129.87 km^{2} (50.14 sq mi)
- Elevation: 150 m (490 ft)
- Highest elevation: 635 m (2,083 ft)
- Lowest elevation: 5 m (16 ft)

Population (2024 census)
  - Total: 18,579
  - Density: 143.06/km^{2} (370.52/sq mi)
  - Households: 4,381

Economy
  - Income class: 3rd municipal income class
  - Poverty incidence: 11.44% (2023)
  - Revenue: ₱ 185 million (2024)
  - Assets: ₱ 577.8 million (2024)
  - Expenditure: ₱ 153.5 million (2024)
  - Liabilities: ₱ 57.65 million (2024)

Service provider
  - Electricity: La Union Electric Cooperative (LUELCO)
- Time zone: UTC+8 (PST)
- ZIP code: 2513
- PSGC: 0103315000
- IDD : area code: +63 (0)72
- Native languages: Ilocano; Tagalog
- Website: https://www.sangabriellaunion.gov.ph/government

San Gabriel , officially the Municipality of San Gabriel (Ilocano: Ili ti San Gabriel; Filipino: Bayan ng San Gabriel), is a landlocked municipality in the province of La Union, Philippines. According to the 2024 census, it has a population of 18,579 people.

== Etymology ==
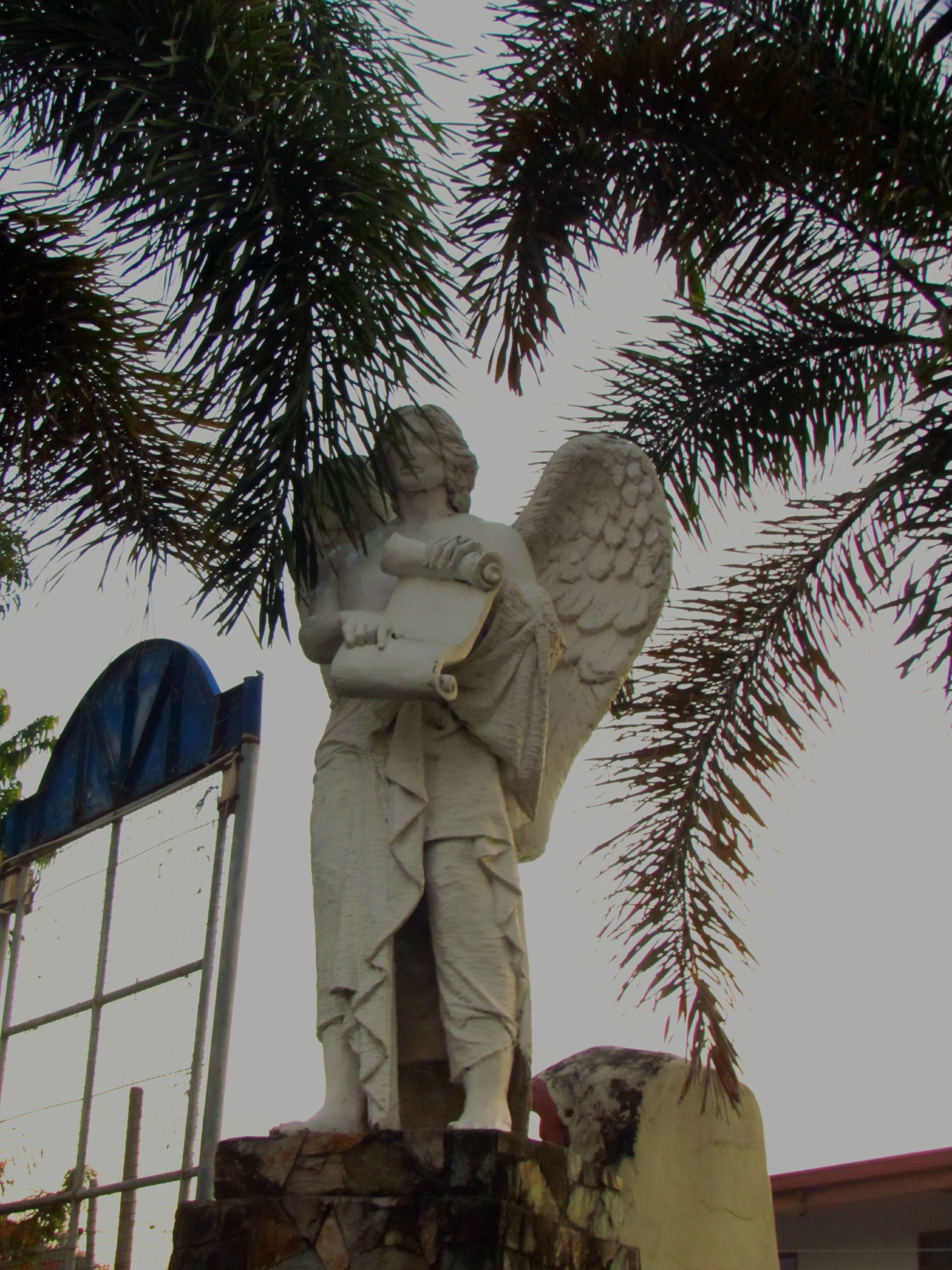
Statue of St. Gabriel the Archangel

The name of the town is derived from its patron saint, Gabriel, one of the archangels in Christian, Jewish, and Islamic traditions, known as a messenger of God. Towns were often named after saints to accord spiritual protection and signify religious devotion, and the choice of Saint Gabriel likely reflects the community's faith or a historical connection, such as the founding of a church or a significant event attributed to his intercession.

== History ==
San Gabriel traces its origins to a settlement of the Kankanaey people, one of the indigenous groups of the Cordillera region. When Spanish colonizers arrived, the Augustinian friars established it as a sitio (small settlement). The sitio’s location, characterized by a wide plain suitable for animal grazing and farming, as well as a nearby river for irrigation, made it an ideal place for settlement. During the Spanish colonial era, this sitio was part of the administrative division known as Amburayan.

The settlement was initially known as “Baka Burnotan,” a name derived from local traditions. The term refers to the game “binnornutan” or tug-of-war, which locals played while grazing their “baka” (Philippine buffalo). These games were often held between the Igorots, predominantly from the Kankanaey tribe who migrated from the Mountain Province to escape tribal conflicts, and Christian settlers from the lowlands. Due to their resilience and hard work in the mountains, the Kankanaey participants often emerged victorious in these contests. Over time, the name "Baka Burnotan" was shortened to Burnotan.

In the 1880s, a Spanish priest named Father Redondo conducted an ocular visit to the area. Recognizing the need for evangelization, he commissioned the construction of a small church made of cogon grass and began preaching to the residents. His efforts, in partnership with the local community, led to the baptism and conversion of many pagan inhabitants to Christianity. On April 20, 1896, Fr. Redondo introduced the image of Saint Gabriel the Archangel as the patron saint of the settlement. A year later, on April 19, 1897, the sitio was officially renamed San Gabriel in honor of its patron.

On May 28, 1902, Act No. 410 of the Philippine Commission created the Lepanto-Bontoc Province, which included Amburayan as one of its sub-provinces. Consequently, San Gabriel became part of this administrative structure. On the same day, Act No. 411 mandated the establishment of local civil governments in the province. Indigenous settlers, referred to as “non-Christian tribes” in official documents, were integrated into municipal governance, with local leaders appointed to oversee their communities. In 1906, San Gabriel conducted its first election, with Don Pablo Waggay elected as the first Township President.

The administrative boundaries shifted again on August 18, 1908, with the issuance of Act No. 1876, which dissolved the Lepanto-Bontoc Province and created the Mountain Province. San Gabriel, as part of the sub-province of Amburayan, became part of this new province.

In 1920, San Gabriel was designated as a Municipal District. Following the resolution of a boundary dispute between La Union and the Mountain Province, Act No. 2877 was issued on February 4, 1920, modifying and establishing the boundary line. In 1922, San Gabriel officially became a municipality of La Union.

During World War II, the vast mountainous areas of San Gabriel became a refuge for people from the Mountain Province and the Ilocos Region. Much of the land in the area was owned by Ama Ontoc, a respected and influential local leader. Upon his death, the settlement was named Amontoc in his honor, a combination of his title "Ama" and his name "Ontoc."

The community grew as families settled in the area, and Amontoc became a barangay (village) of San Gabriel. The first recognized leaders of Amontoc were Teniente del Barrio Lakay Madan (Madan Salungkit), followed by Lakay Oseng (Pedro Oseng) and Lakay Doro (Doro Tagatag). These leaders played significant roles during World War II, resisting Japanese invaders. Amontoc was officially recognized as a barangay of San Gabriel in 1992.

Through Executive Order No. 72 issued on July 30, 1947, by President Manuel Roxas, San Gabriel was reaffirmed as one of the 17 municipalities of La Union. This order was sponsored by then-Speaker Pro-Tempore Francisco Ortega and aligned with the Revised Administrative Code of 1917.

Today, San Gabriel stands as a municipality with a rich history of cultural integration, resilience, and adaptation to changing political landscapes. Its roots as a Kankanaey settlement and its evolution under Spanish and American rule are central to its identity, making it a significant part of La Union's history.

== Geography ==
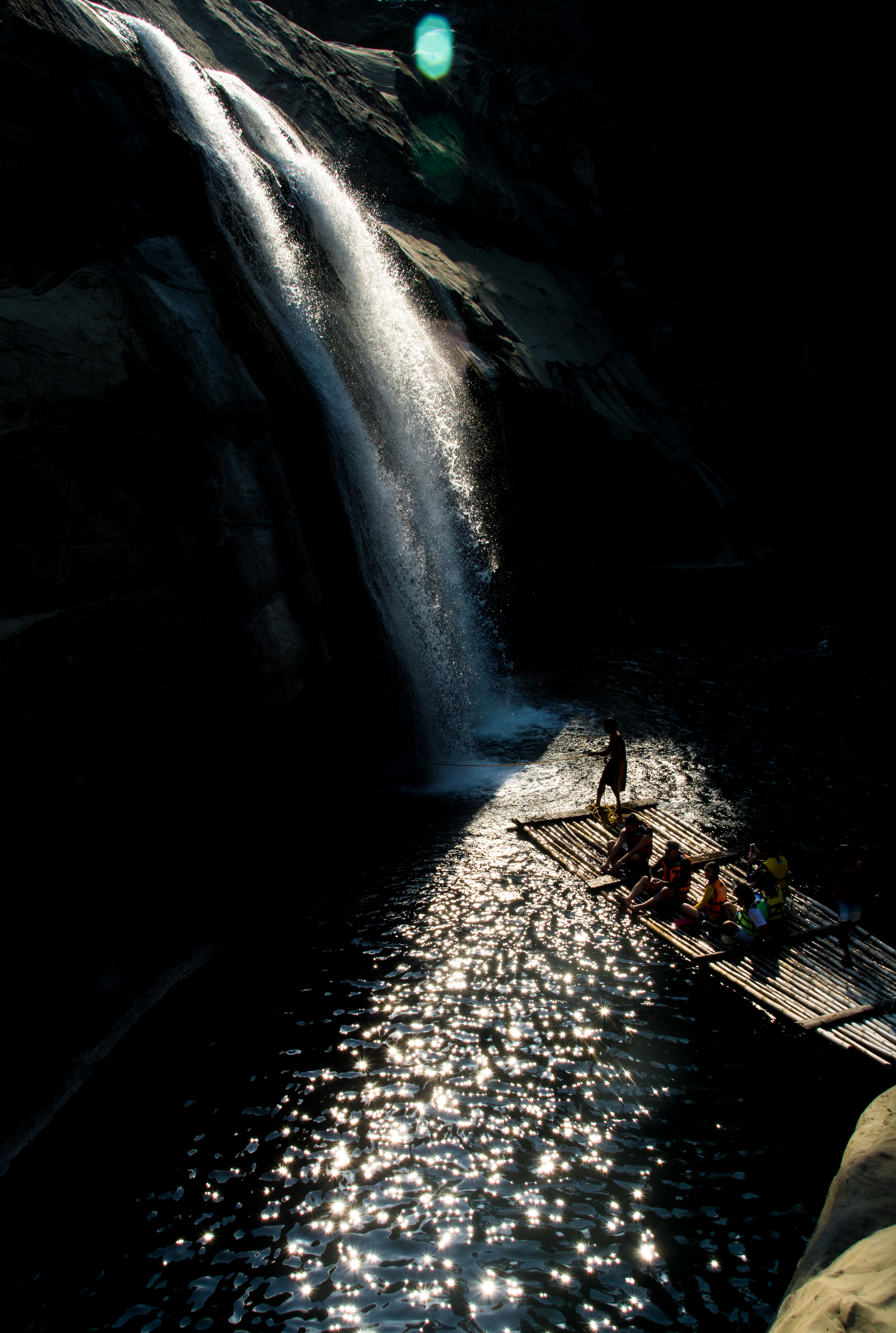
Tangadan Falls

The Municipality of San Gabriel is recognized as the largest municipality by land area in La Union. The town’s topography is predominantly mountainous, gradually ascending eastward, with a mix of scrubland, grassland, and wetland ecosystems. Its landscape is traversed by the Baroro River, the town's major waterway, which also features the renowned Tangadan Falls, a popular tourist destination.

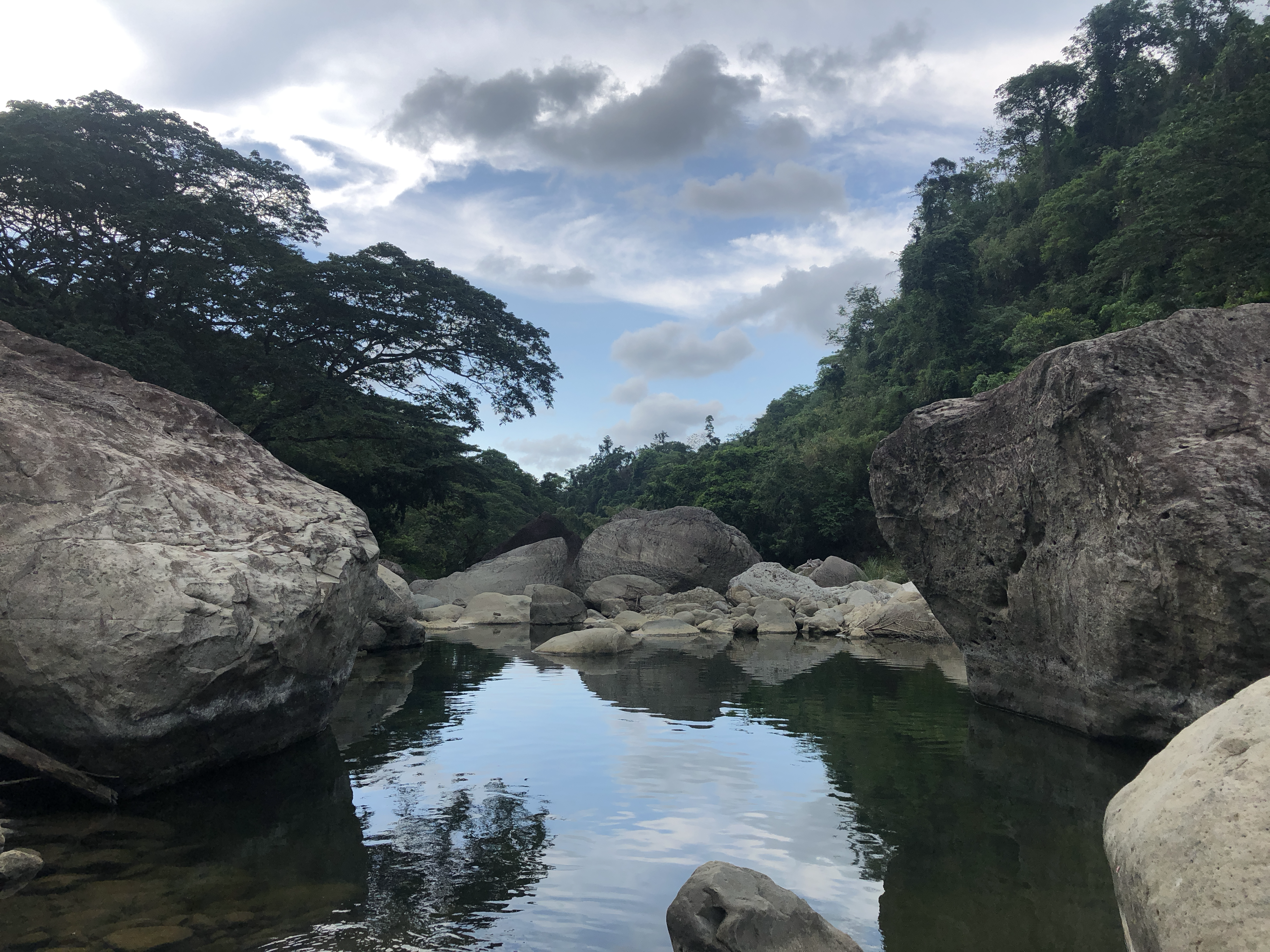
Baroro River along San Gabriel

The municipality is landlocked and bordered by various neighboring towns. To the north, it shares a boundary with Santol, marked by an imaginary line beginning in Ticor and following the course of the Malanas River. On the eastern side, San Gabriel is bounded by Kapangan in the province of Benguet, with the border defined by an imaginary line starting from the Bacawayan River Junction, running southward along a creek, and extending to the Cabassitan River near Barangay Duplas of San Juan. To the west, it is bordered by Bacnotan, with the boundary extending from Sitio Bato to a point in Lacong and then continuing along a straight imaginary line to Ticor, located north of Sitio Matagectec in Barangay Lacong. To the south, it shares a border with Bagulin, while the southwest boundary is marked by San Juan. The southwestern border begins at Duplas, follows the Cabassitan River westward to a concrete monument near Alangigan, and then proceeds northwest along an imaginary line to Sitio Bato, crossing the Dayacos River.

San Gabriel is situated 16.34 kilometres (10.15 mi) from the provincial capital San Fernando, and 282.21 kilometres (175.36 mi) from the country's capital city of Manila.

=== Barangays ===
San Gabriel is politically subdivided into 15 barangays. Each barangay consists of puroks and some have sitios.

- Amontoc
- Apayao
- Balbalayang
- Bayabas
- Bucao
- Bumbuneg
- Daking
- Lacong
- Lipay Este
- Lipay Norte
- Lipay Proper
- Lipay Sur
- Lon-oy
- Poblacion
- Polipol

=== Climate ===
Climate data for San Gabriel, La Union
Month	Jan	Feb	Mar	Apr	May	Jun	Jul	Aug	Sep	Oct	Nov	Dec	Year
Mean daily maximum °C (°F)	30 (86)	31 (88)	32 (90)	33 (91)	32 (90)	31 (88)	30 (86)	30 (86)	30 (86)	31 (88)	31 (88)	31 (88)	31 (88)
Mean daily minimum °C (°F)	21 (70)	22 (72)	23 (73)	25 (77)	26 (79)	26 (79)	25 (77)	25 (77)	25 (77)	24 (75)	23 (73)	22 (72)	24 (75)
Average precipitation mm (inches)	42 (1.7)	48 (1.9)	74 (2.9)	110 (4.3)	269 (10.6)	275 (10.8)	362 (14.3)	325 (12.8)	330 (13.0)	306 (12.0)	126 (5.0)	61 (2.4)	2,328 (91.7)
Average rainy days	11.2	12.0	17.1	21.2	27.1	26.8	28.1	27.0	26.0	24.5	17.7	12.4	251.1
Source: Meteoblue

== Demographics ==
Population census of San Gabriel
Year	Pop.	±% p.a.
1918	3,485	—
1939	5,293	+2.01%
1948	5,805	+1.03%
1960	7,546	+2.21%
1970	8,527	+1.23%
1975	9,808	+2.85%
1980	10,248	+0.88%
1990	12,532	+2.03%
1995	13,489	+1.39%
2000	14,909	+2.17%
2007	15,803	+0.81%
2010	16,628	+1.87%
2015	18,172	+1.71%
2020	18,943	+0.88%
2024	18,579	−0.46%
Source: Philippine Statistics Authority

In the 2020 census, the population of San Gabriel, La Union, was 18,943 people, with a density of 150 inhabitants per square kilometre or 390 inhabitants per square mile.

== Economy ==
Poverty incidence of San Gabriel (%)

Source: Philippine Statistics Authority

San Gabriel is an agricultural town. In its early days, the people of San Gabriel were engaged mainly in highland farming as their means of livelihood. They produced rice, corn, sweet potatoes, and other root crops. As years passed, crop production decreased due to massive soil erosion in the uplands. Nevertheless, the inhabitants decided to improve their farming techniques and started making terraces. The perseverance of the people in constructing rice terraces and irrigation system along the hills and mountains of San Gabriel caused agricultural productivity to rebound.

Bananas and tiger grass ("Thysanolaena maxina") are also abundant in San Gabriel, which harvests materials for soft broom production on a weekly basis.

== Government ==
=== Local government ===
San Gabriel, belonging to the first congressional district of the province of La Union, is governed by a mayor designated as its local chief executive and by a municipal council as its legislative body in accordance with the Local Government Code. The mayor, vice mayor, and the councilors are elected directly by the people through an election which is being held every three years.

=== Elected officials ===
Members of the Municipal Council (2022-2025)
Position	Name
Congressman	Francisco Paolo P. Ortega V
Mayor	Lany B. Carbonell
Vice-Mayor	Ramolito A. Guinomma
Councilors	Mario P. Aligo
Councilors	Jerry T. Fernandez
Councilors	Geoffrey D. Awingan
Councilors	Mardo A. Bang-oa
Councilors	Isagani L. Dumaoang
Councilors	Mauricio P. Canutab
Councilors	Dominador P. Abuan
Councilors	Danilo A. Elias JR.

== Tourism ==
- Gumayenggeng Falls at Barangay Lipay
- Katebbegan Fall at Barangay Lipay Proper
- Bakes Falls and Lon-oy Spring at Barangay Lon-oy
- Lineng Pool at Poblacion
- Tinnag-Americano Falls at Barangay Polipol
- Tangadan Falls located at Barangay Amontoc

== Education ==
The San Gabriel Schools District Office governs all educational institutions within the municipality. It oversees the management and operations of all private and public elementary and high schools.

=== Primary and secondary schools ===
- Amontoc Elementary School
- Antonino Memorial Elementary School
- Bayabas Elementary School
- Bumbuneg Elementary School
- Lacong Elementary School
- Lacong Elementary School-Annex
- Lon-oy Elementary School
- Nayba Elementary School
- Padang Primary School
- Polipol Elementary School
- San Gabriel Central School
- Sisi Elementary School
- Siwsiwan Elementary School
- UCCP - Nursery-Kindergarten School

=== Secondary schools ===
- Balbalayang National High School
- Lipay Integrated School
- Saint Gabriel the Archangel High School
- San Gabriel Senior High School
- San Gabriel Vocational High School

== Gallery ==
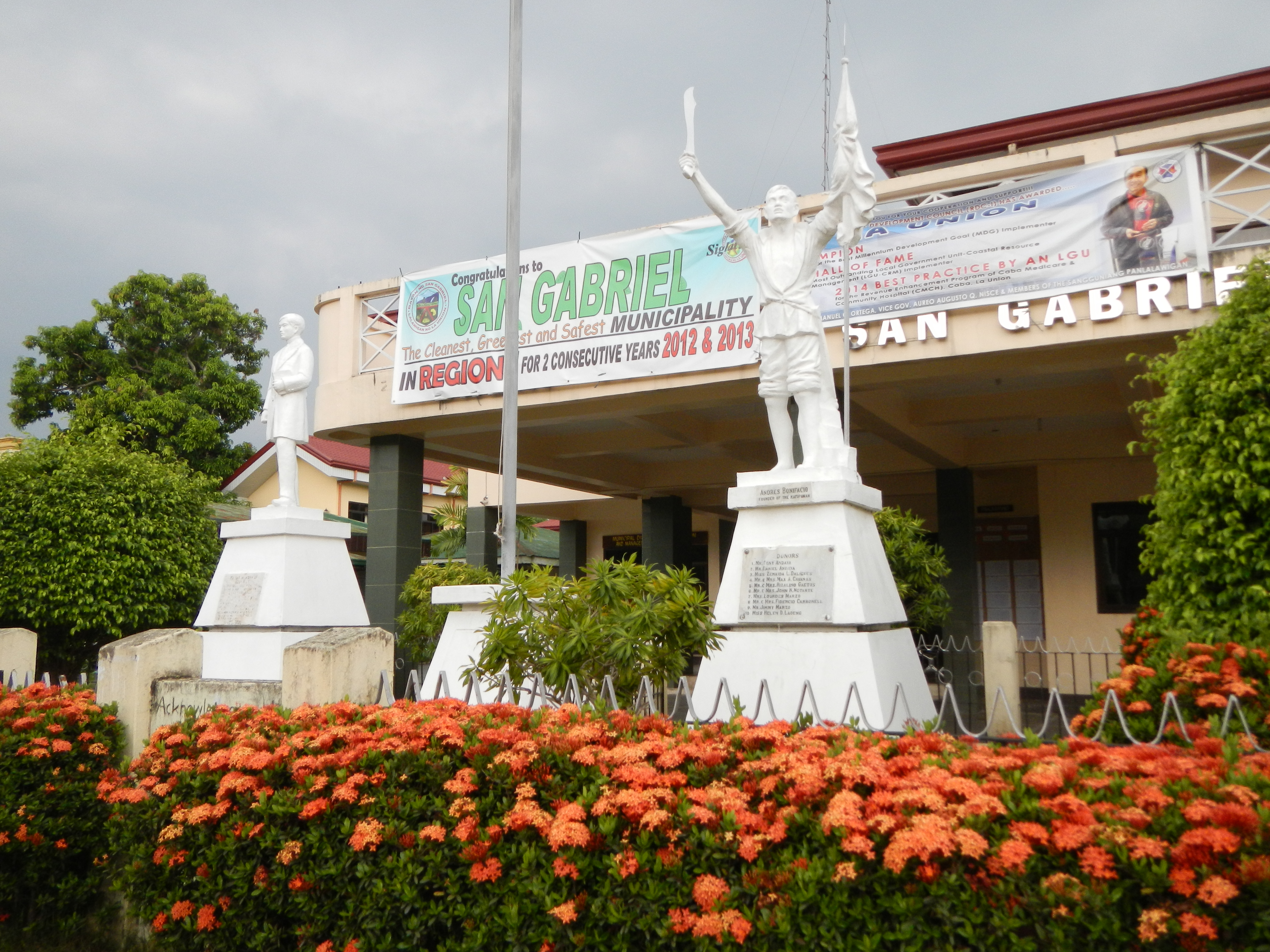
Municipal hall

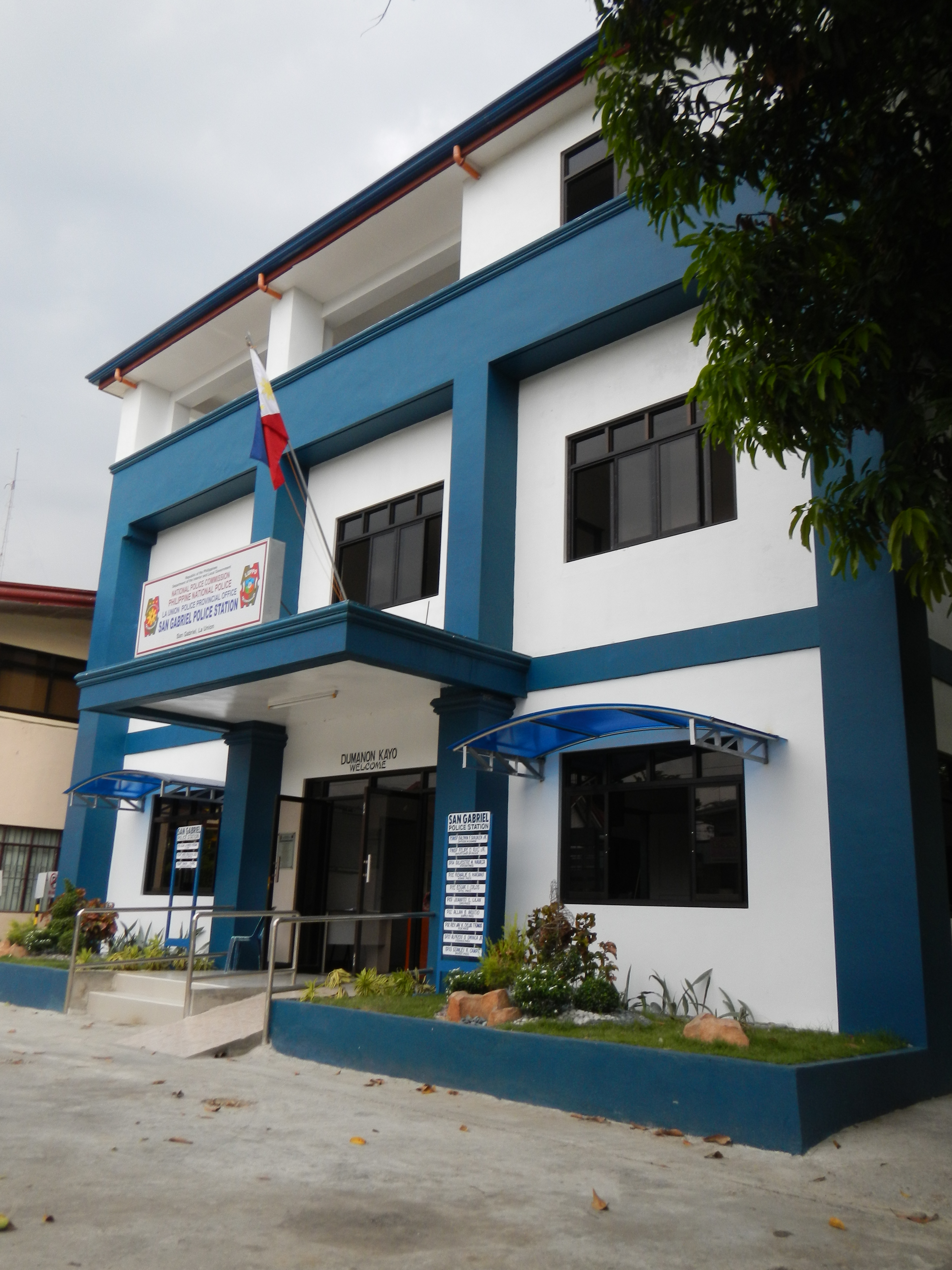
Police station

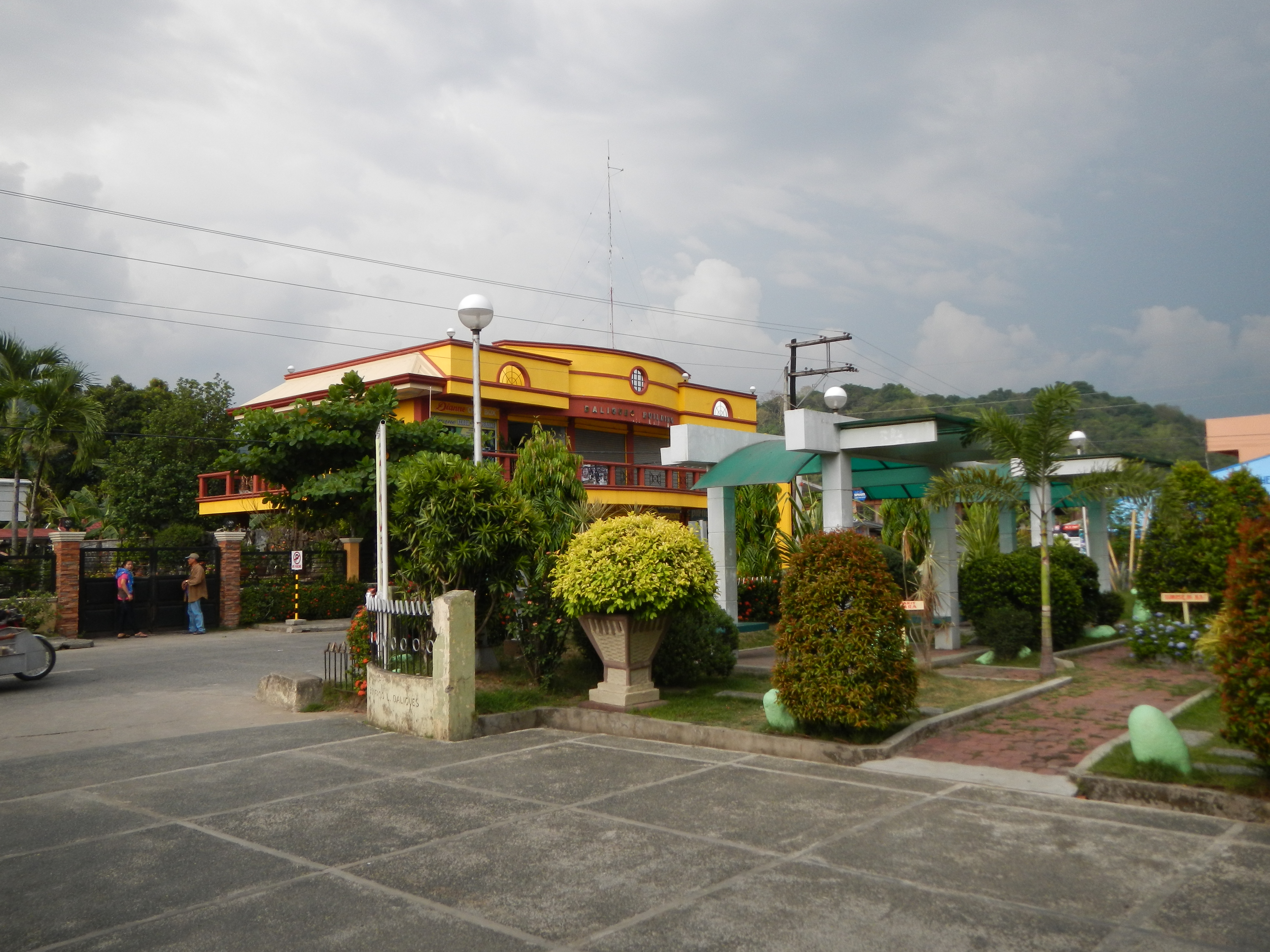
Town center

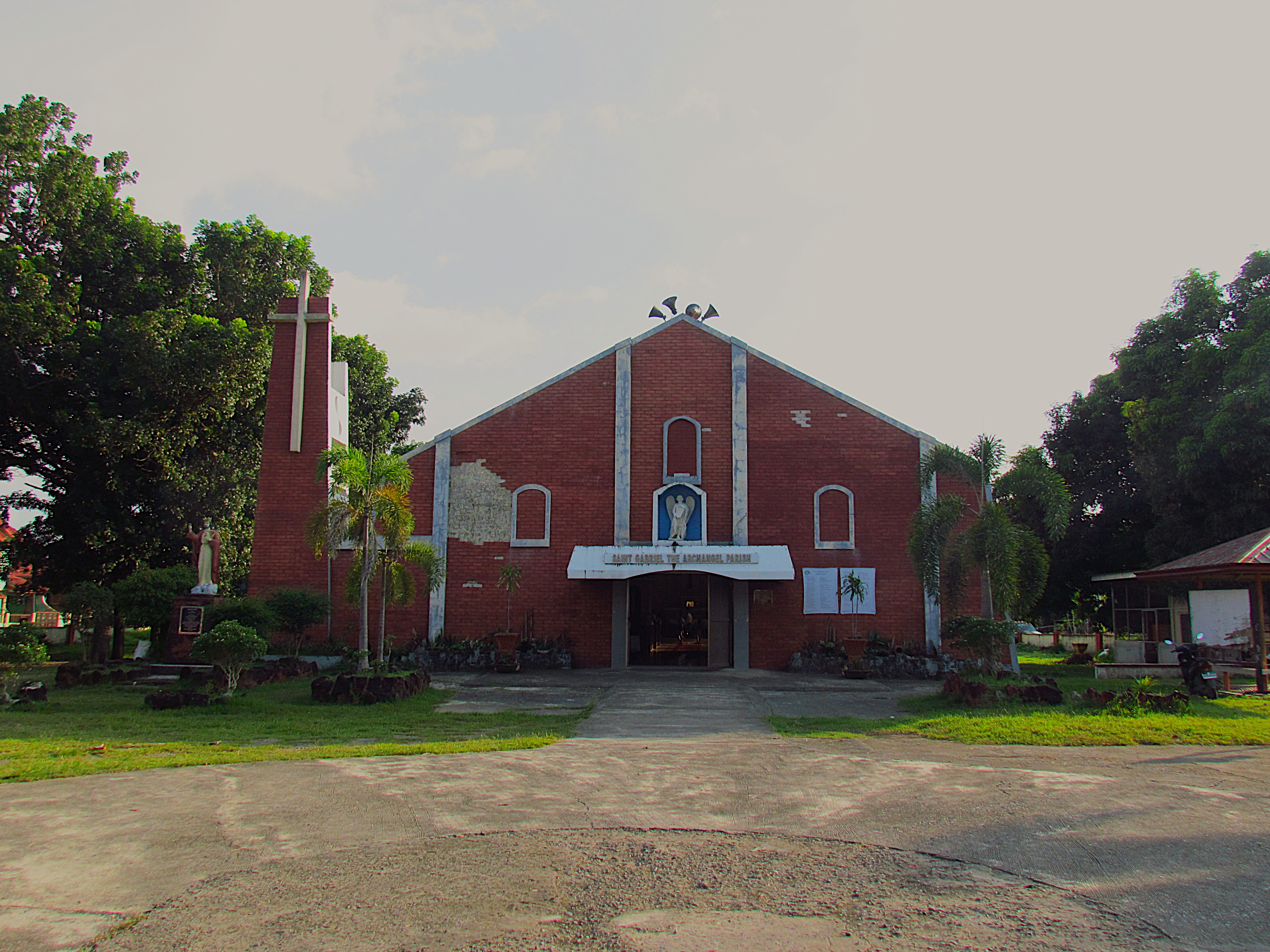
Saint Gabriel the Archangel Church

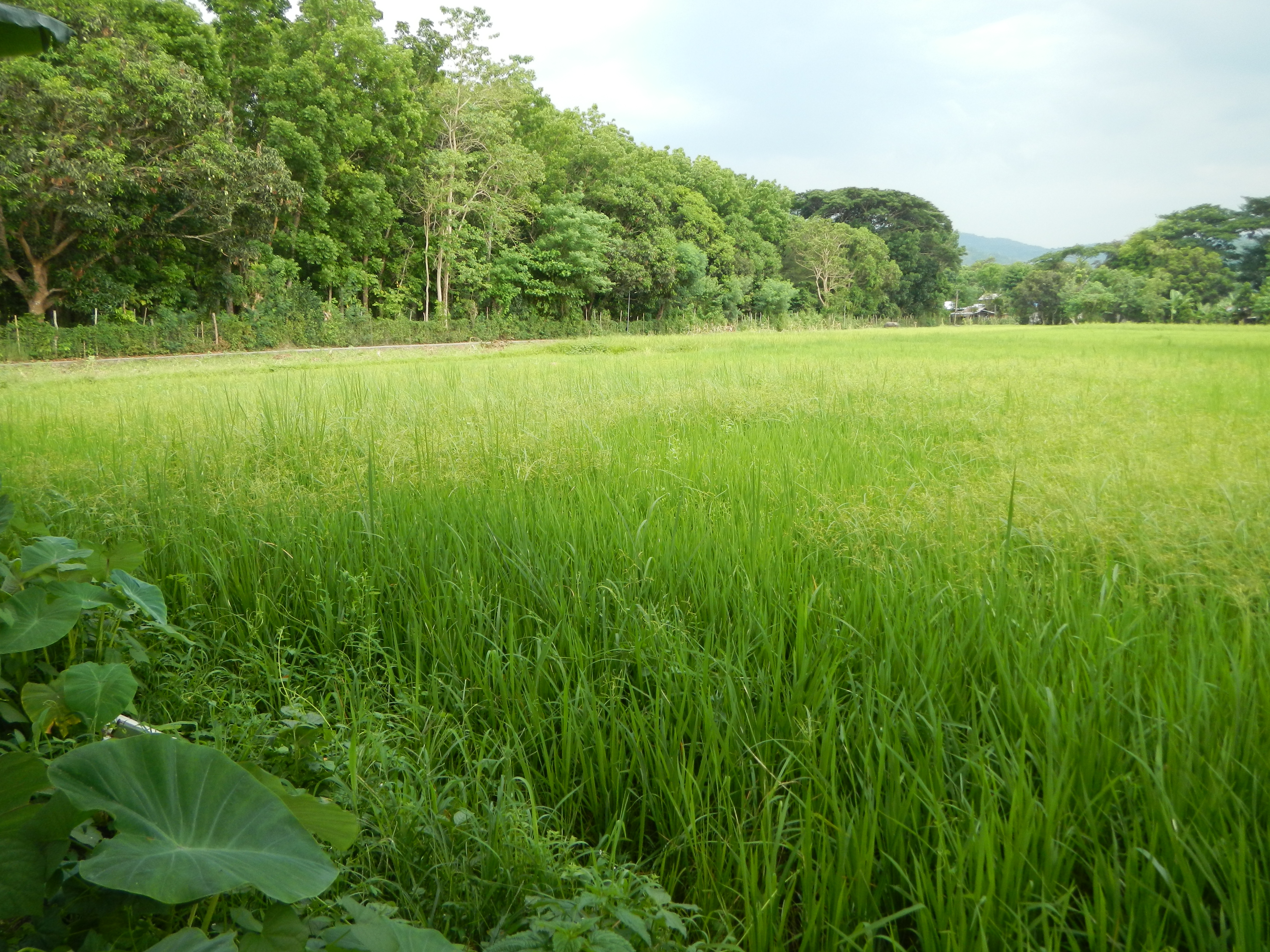
Rural landscape
