= Santol, La Union =

Santol
- Municipality
- Municipality of Santol
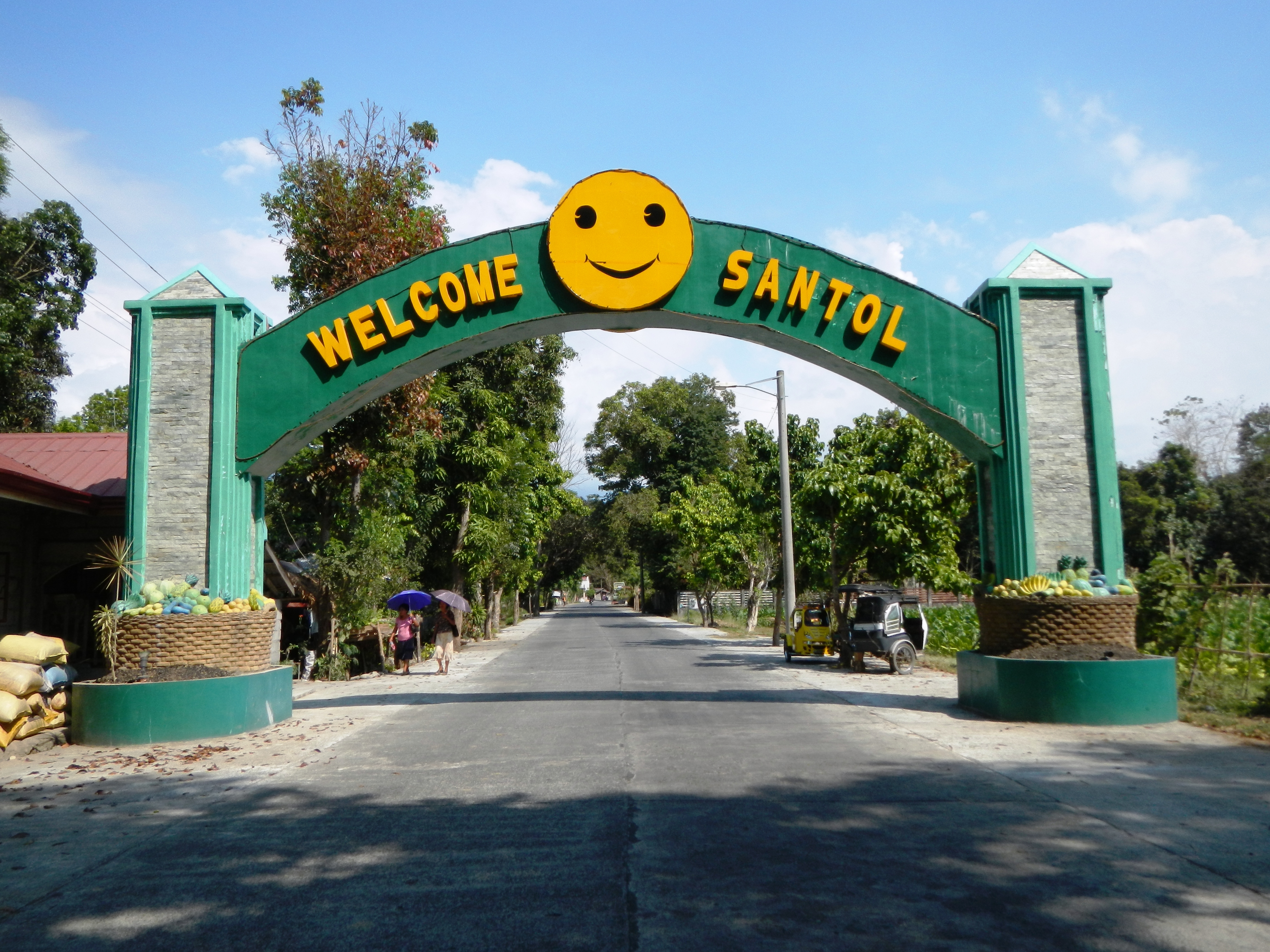
- Welcome arch

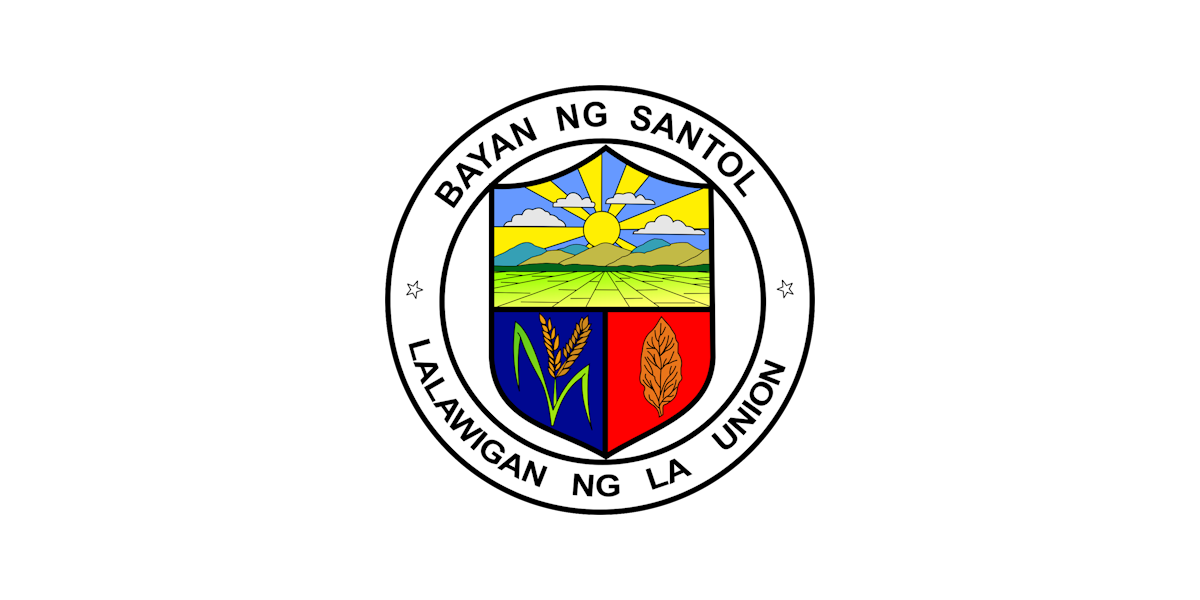
- Flag Seal
- Motto: Itan Santol
- Anthem: Santol Hymn
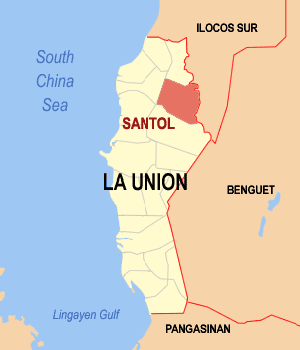
- Map of La Union with Santol highlighted
- Interactive map of Santol
- Location within the Philippines
- Coordinates: 16°46′N 120°27′E
- Country: Philippines
- Region: Ilocos Region
- Province: La Union
- District: 1st district
- Barangays: 11 (see Barangays)

Government
  - Type: Sangguniang Bayan
  - Mayor: Theresea Lyn Wailan Senen
  - Vice Mayor: Jojo Ominga
  - Representative: Francisco Paolo P. Ortega V
  - Municipal Council: Members: Rodel Delio Millares; Roxanne Dangle; Ramil Sansano; Edward Wailan; Bernard Pepe
  - Electorate: 9,689 voters (2025)

Area
  - Total: 93.70 km^{2} (36.18 sq mi)
- Elevation: 226 m (741 ft)
- Highest elevation: 798 m (2,618 ft)
- Lowest elevation: 17 m (56 ft)

Population (2024 census)
  - Total: 14,877
  - Density: 158.8/km^{2} (411.2/sq mi)
  - Households: 3,325

Economy
  - Income class: 1st municipal income class
  - Poverty incidence: 14.39% (2023)
  - Revenue: ₱ 344.4 million (2024)
  - Assets: ₱ 1,024 million (2024)
  - Expenditure: ₱ 134.9 million (2024)
  - Liabilities: ₱ 69.07 million (2024)

Service provider
  - Electricity: La Union Electric Cooperative (LUELCO)
- Time zone: UTC+8 (PST)
- ZIP code: 2505
- PSGC: 0103318000
- IDD : area code: +63 (0)72
- Native languages: Ilocano; Tagalog Kan-kaney Gaddang
- Website: www.santol.gov.ph

Santol, officially the Municipality of Santol (Ilocano: Municipalidad Iti Santol; Filipino: Bayan ng Santol), is a municipality in the province of La Union, Philippines. According to the 2024 census, it has a population of 14,877 people.

== History ==
Santol, a Balaoan northeastern Rancheria, became a township in 1908 under the sub-province Amburayan, Mountain Province. An Igorot named Lakay Camilot was its first municipal president.

In 1920, a new province was carved out of the old Lepanto-Amburayan sub-province to showcase the socio-cultural integration amongst lowlanders, mountaineers and the Bagos. Three towns (San Gabriel, Sudipen and Santol) were proposed for the planned province to be named Harrison, a former American Governor-General who championed Filipinization and integration.

However, protest resolutions were filed by the leaders of these municipalities unanimously objecting to their inclusion because of historical, economic, cultural and geographical reasons. As a result, the proposal did not prosper.

In 1922, Mountain Province relinquished Santol which became a municipal district of La Union. Santol was elevated into a regular municipality status in 1949 by virtue of Executive Order No. 214 issued by then President Elpidio Quirino.

The town of Santol is considered a safe harbor for there had been no distinct destruction of lives or properties during the historic events regarding wars and calamities. Such was true during the Spanish regime and Japanese occupation. Evidence of this is that Barrio Mangan was set aside as the place of the military emergency hospital. It was also here where the center of distribution of food supplies for army personnel was located. Barrio Banbanaba was the site of message center which is directly in touch with all the barrios of Balaoan, Santol, San Gabriel and Sudipen.

Santol Central and Cadanglaan served as the grounds for training volunteers during the days nearing the landing of the Liberation Forces while Sammauting was the hiding place for the guerillas.

There are two accounts as to how Santol derived its name. The first version states that the place was once a favorite hunting ground for people interested in the sculpting of religious images. In one of their hunts for material sculpture, they saw a huge tree called Santol. The size of the tree was so remarkable that several images were carved out from a single trunk, thus made it their main material in wood carving.

The second version states that during the Spanish occupation, soldiers passed by the area, but the women did not understand Spanish and presumed the soldiers were asking for the name of the fruits they were carrying. One of the women answered – “Santol, Apo.”. the soldiers also did not understand the dialect and all they remembered was the word Santol, hence, the name of the place.

== Geography ==
The Municipality of Santol is situated in the north-eastern part of the province of La Union. It is bounded on the north by the Municipality of Sudipen, on the north-east by the upland Municipality of Sugpon in Ilocos Sur, on the south by the Municipality of San Gabriel, and on the west by the Municipality of Balaoan, and on the south east by the Municipality of Kapangan Benguet

Santol is situated 33.10 kilometres (20.57 mi) from the provincial capital San Fernando, and 298.97 kilometres (185.77 mi) from the country's capital city of Manila.

=== Barangays ===
Santol has 10 barangays. Each barangay consists of puroks and some have sitios.

- Poblacion
- Mangaan
- Corroy
- Lettac Sur
- Lettac Norte
- Sasaba
- Tubaday
- Sapdaan
- Paagan
- Ramot

Purok

- Batang
- Binatadan
- Stio Inasan
- Liguay
- Potrido
- Balay Udang
- Tico
- Sitio Palayen
- Sitio Gambang

=== Climate ===
Climate data for Santol, La Union
Month	Jan	Feb	Mar	Apr	May	Jun	Jul	Aug	Sep	Oct	Nov	Dec	Year
Mean daily maximum °C (°F)	30 (86)	31 (88)	32 (90)	33 (91)	32 (90)	31 (88)	30 (86)	29 (84)	30 (86)	31 (88)	31 (88)	30 (86)	31 (88)
Mean daily minimum °C (°F)	21 (70)	22 (72)	23 (73)	25 (77)	26 (79)	25 (77)	25 (77)	25 (77)	25 (77)	24 (75)	23 (73)	21 (70)	24 (75)
Average precipitation mm (inches)	42 (1.7)	48 (1.9)	74 (2.9)	110 (4.3)	269 (10.6)	275 (10.8)	362 (14.3)	325 (12.8)	330 (13.0)	306 (12.0)	126 (5.0)	61 (2.4)	2,328 (91.7)
Average rainy days	11.2	12.0	17.1	21.2	27.1	26.8	28.1	27.0	26.0	24.5	17.7	12.4	251.1
Source: Meteoblue

== Demographics ==
Population census of Santol
Year	Pop.	±% p.a.
1918	3,536	—
1939	4,901	+1.57%
1948	5,060	+0.36%
1960	6,125	+1.60%
1970	7,316	+1.79%
1975	7,686	+0.99%
1980	7,836	+0.39%
1990	9,544	+1.99%
1995	10,209	+1.27%
2000	11,202	+2.01%
2007	11,712	+0.62%
2010	12,007	+0.91%
2015	12,476	+0.73%
2020	14,166	+2.71%
2024	14,877	+1.18%
Source: Philippine Statistics Authority

In the 2024 census, the population of Santol, La Union, was 5,381people, with a density of 150 inhabitants per square kilometre or 390 inhabitants per square mile.

== Economy ==
Poverty incidence of Santol (%)

Source: Philippine Statistics Authority

== Government ==
=== Local government ===
Santol is part of the first congressional district of the province of La Union. It is governed by a mayor designated as its local chief executive and by a municipal council as its legislative body in accordance with the Local Government Code. The mayor, vice mayor, and the councilors are elected directly by the people through an election which is being held every three years.

=== Elected officials ===
Members of the Municipal Council (2025–2027)
Position	Name
Congressman	Paolo Ortega
Mayor	Theresa Lyn Wailan Senen
Vice-Mayor	Jojo Ominga
Sanggunian Officials	Rodel Delio Millares
Sanggunian Officials	Roxanne Dangle
Sanggunian Officials	Edward Alipda Wailan
Sanggunian Officials	Randy Balanon
Sanggunian Officials	Bernard Pepe
Sanggunian Officials	Ramil Sansano
Sanggunian Officials	Arjay Ragmac

== Churches ==
- The Jesus Church - Santol Mission
- The Lady of the Victory Church
- All Christians Pavilion
- The Jesus Church - Sapdaan, Santol, La Union
- The Jesus Church "TJC" - Binatadan, Santol, La Union
- Niog Church (according to map)
- United Christ in the Philippines
- Haven Bible Baptist Church and Ministries

== Education ==
The Santol Schools District Office governs all educational institutions within the municipality. It oversees the management and operations of all private and public elementary and high schools.

=== Primary and elementary schools ===
- Banbanaba Elementary School
- Bay-o Elementary School
- Corrooy Elementary School
- Binatadan Elementary School
- Lettac Norte Elementary Schoo
- Liguay Elementary School
- Mangaan Elementary School
- Paagan Elementary School
- Pisnadan Primary School
- Ramot Elementary School
- Santol Central School
- Sapdaan Elementary School
- Sasaba Primary School
- Tubaday Primary School

=== Secondary schools ===
- Corro-oy Integrated School
- Corro-oy National High School
- Liguay National High School
- Publikong Paaralan ng Santol
- Santol Vocational High School
- Santol Vocational High School - Liguay Annex
- St Isidore Academy

== Gallery ==
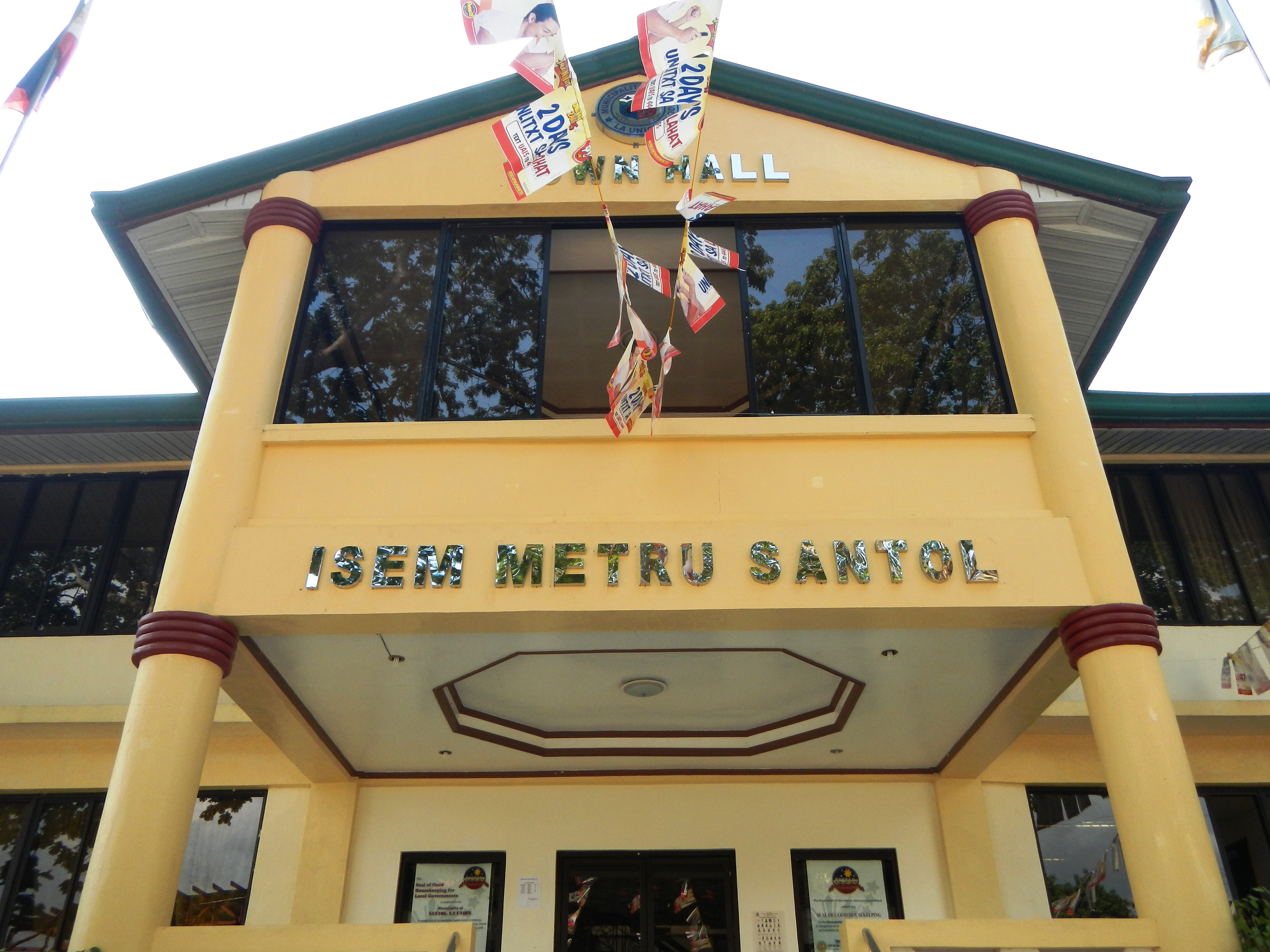
Municipal hall

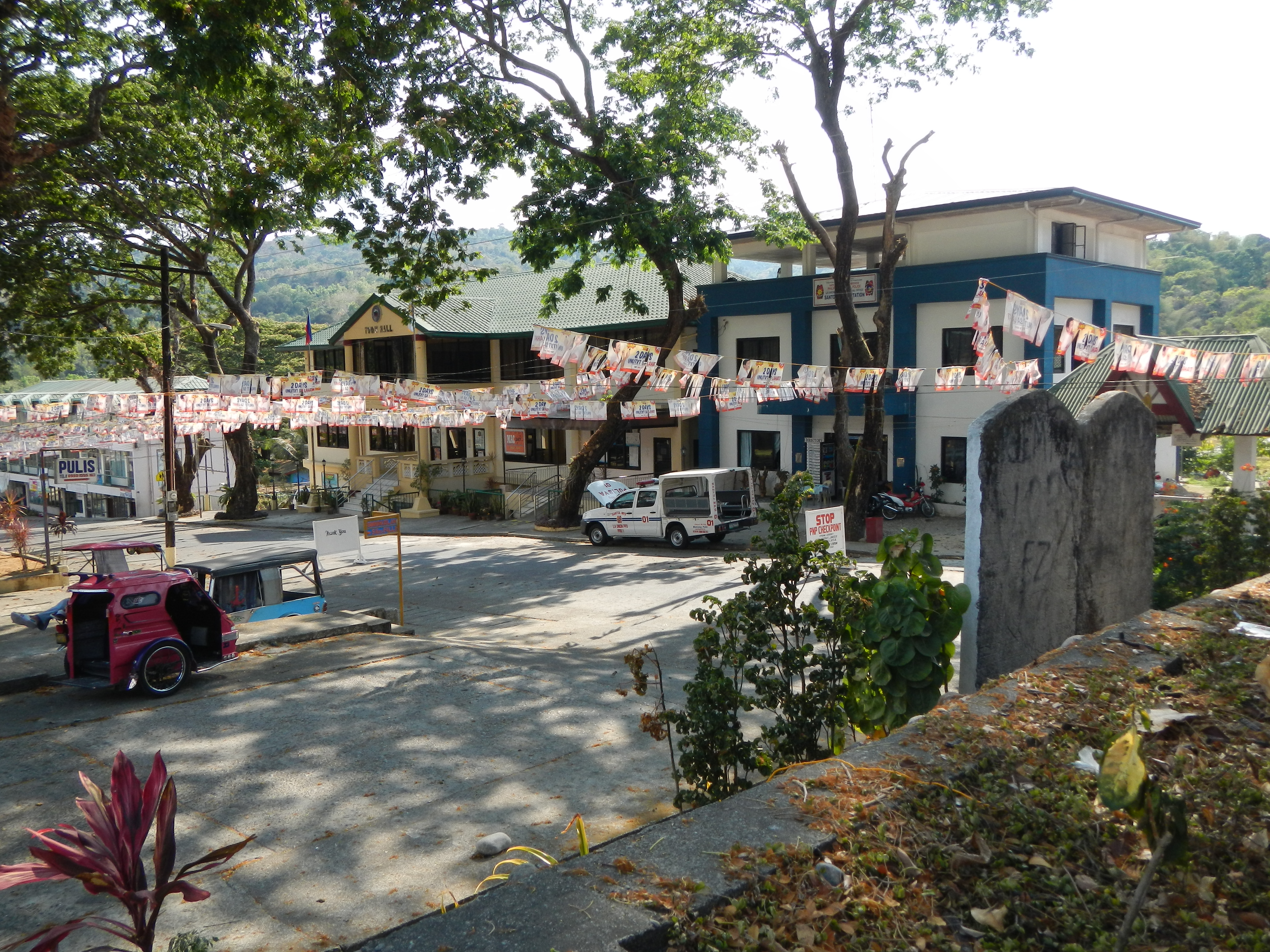
Town center

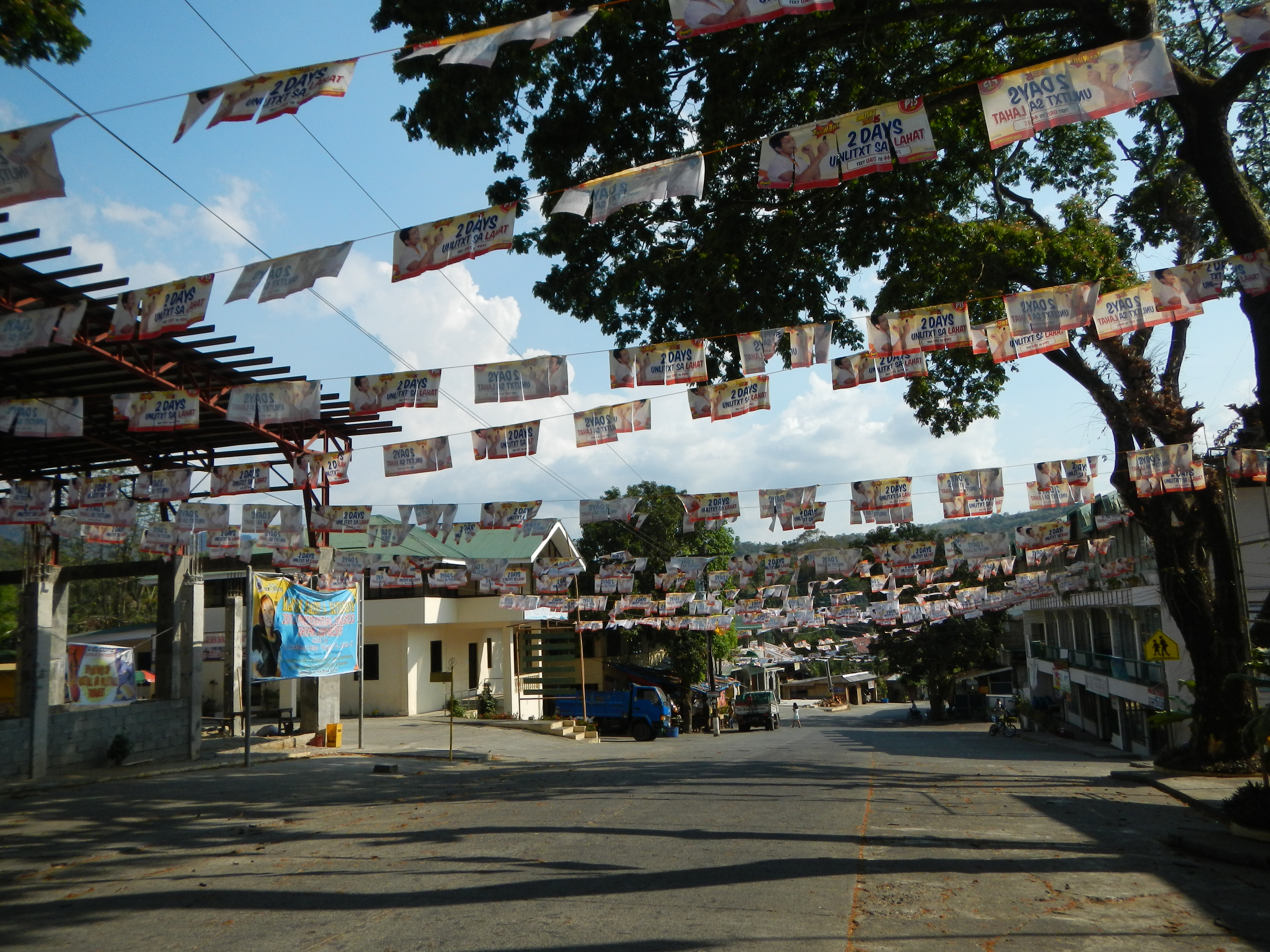
Town center

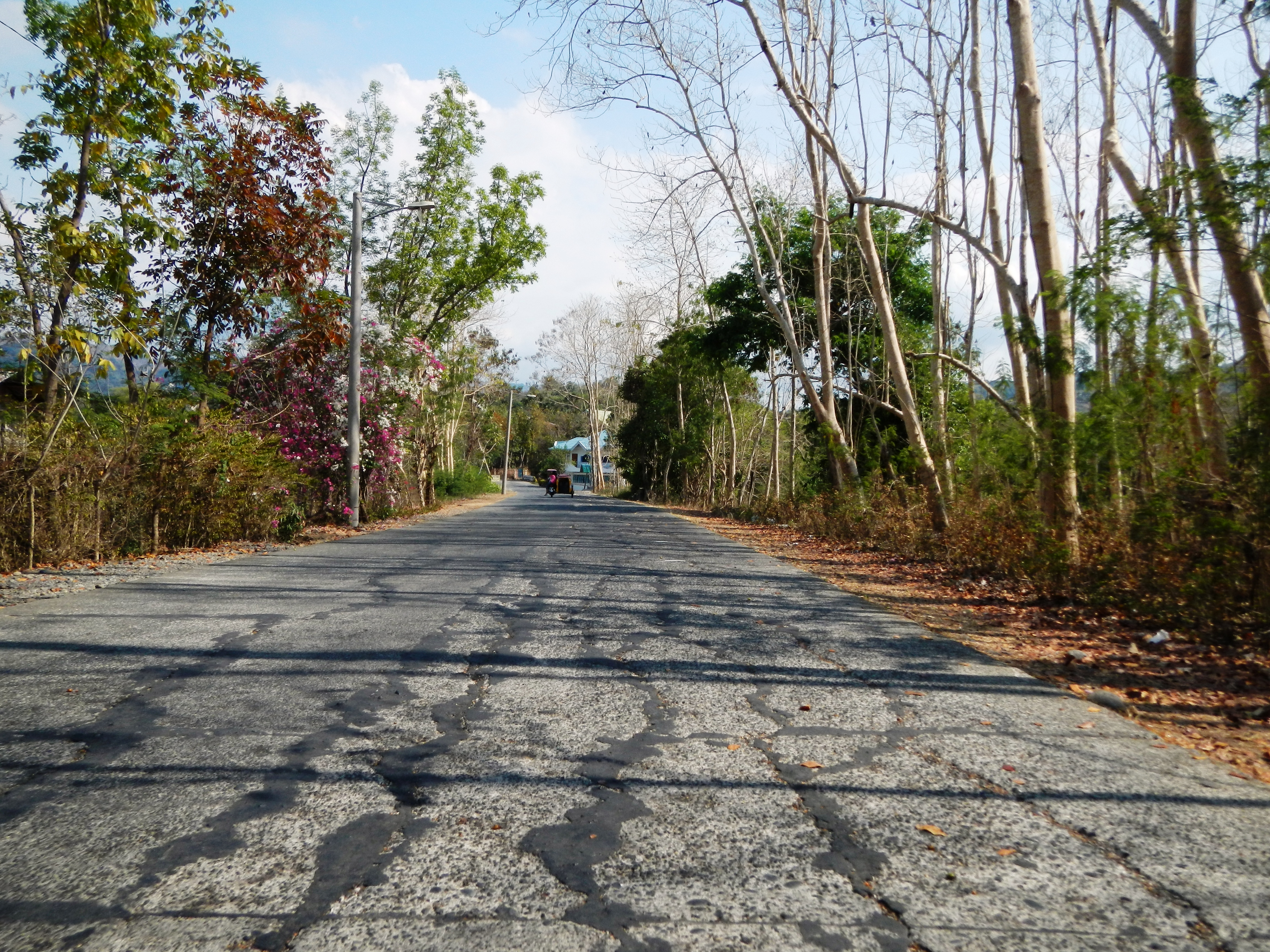
Street view and landscape

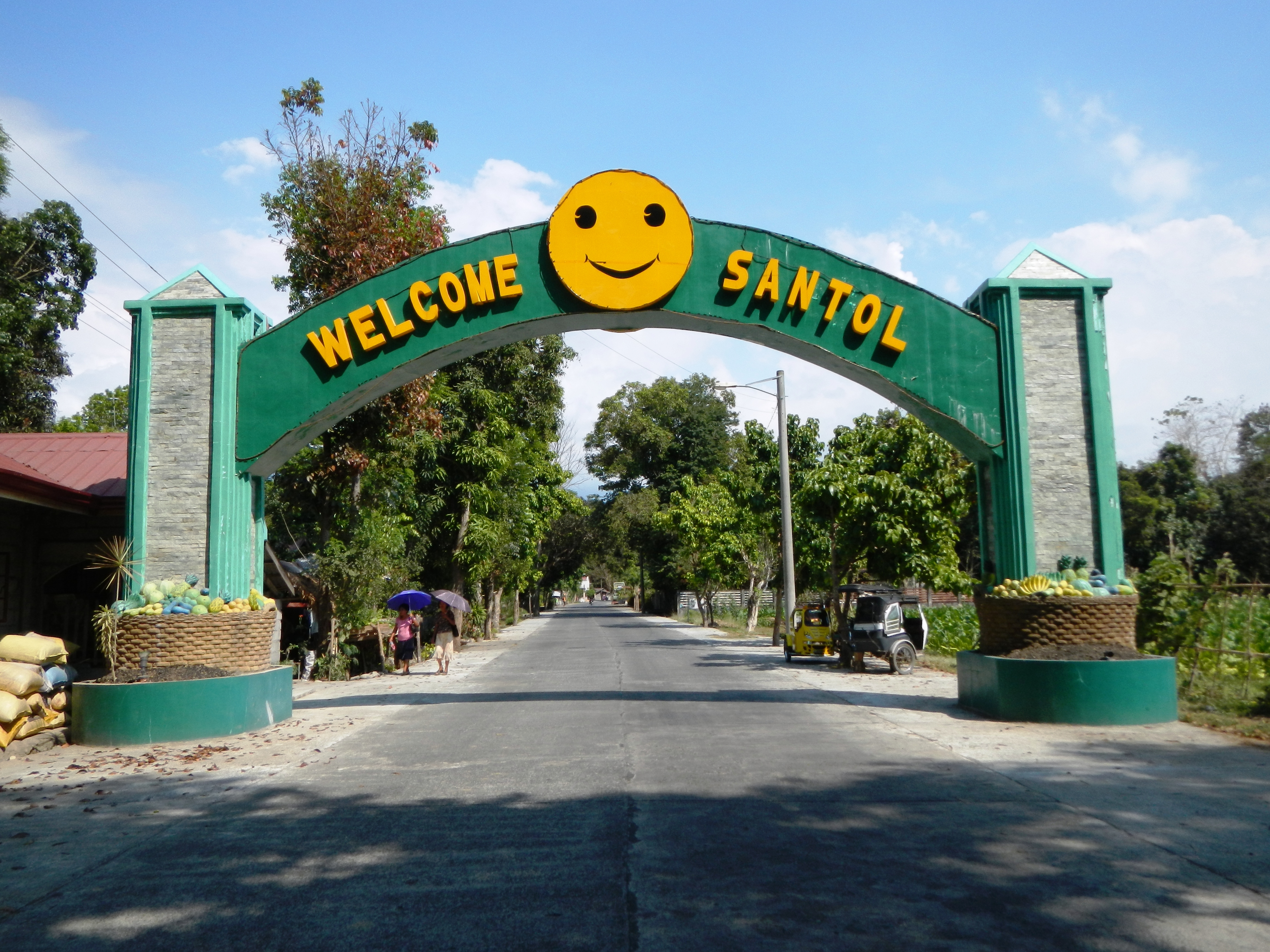
Santol Arch
