= Burgos, La Union =

Municipality in La Union, Philippines

Burgos Disdis
- Municipality
- Municipality of Burgos
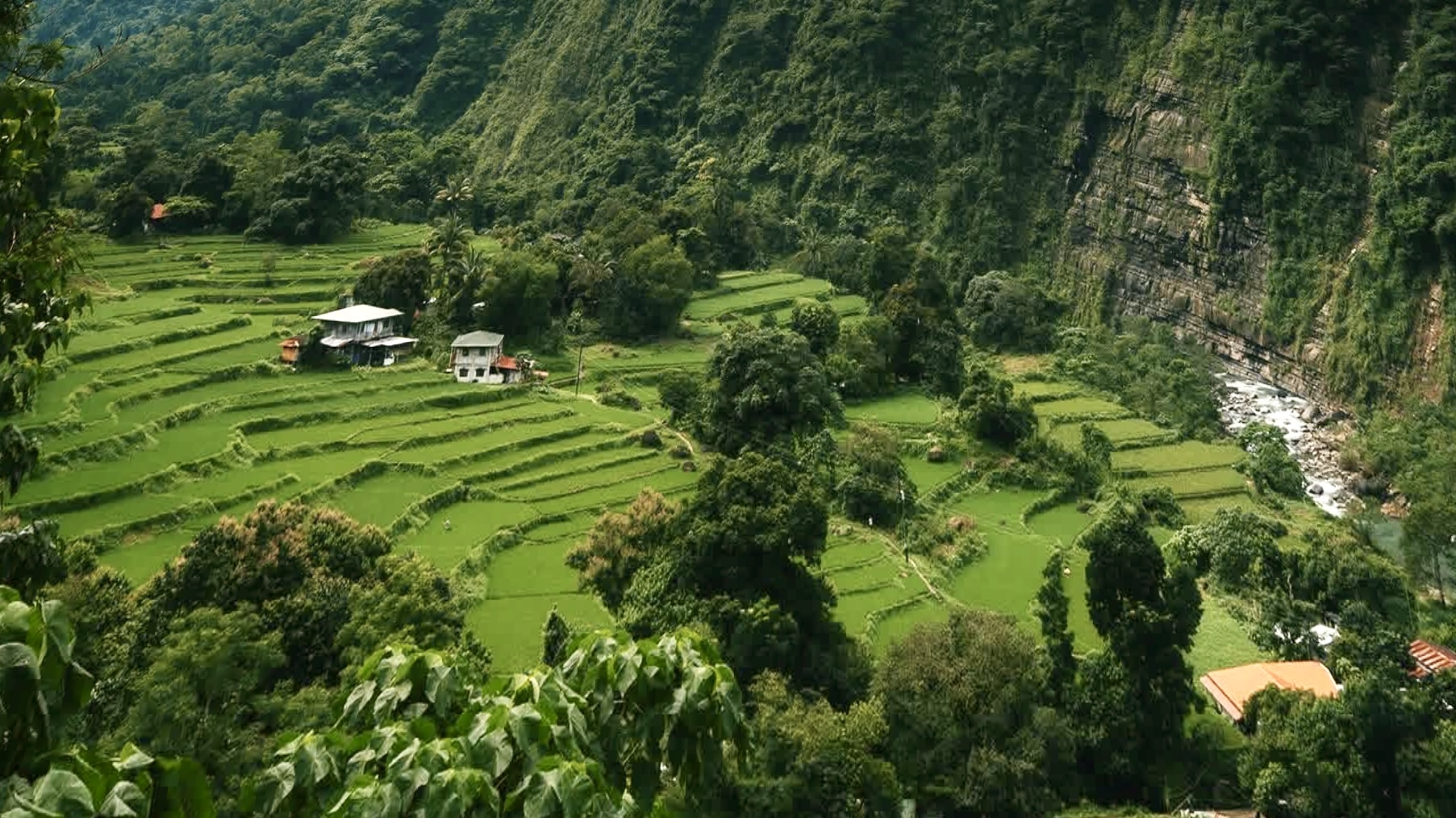
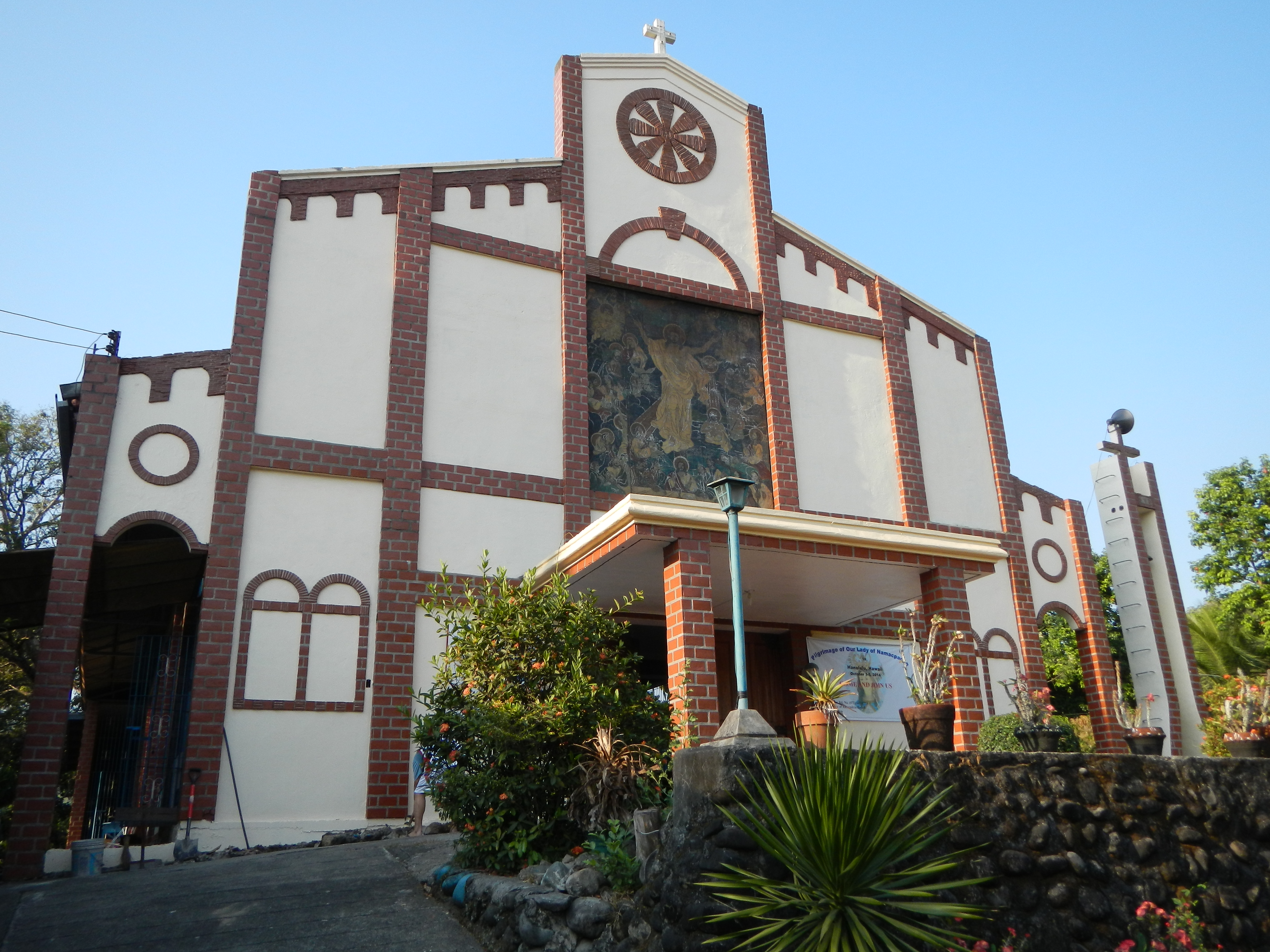
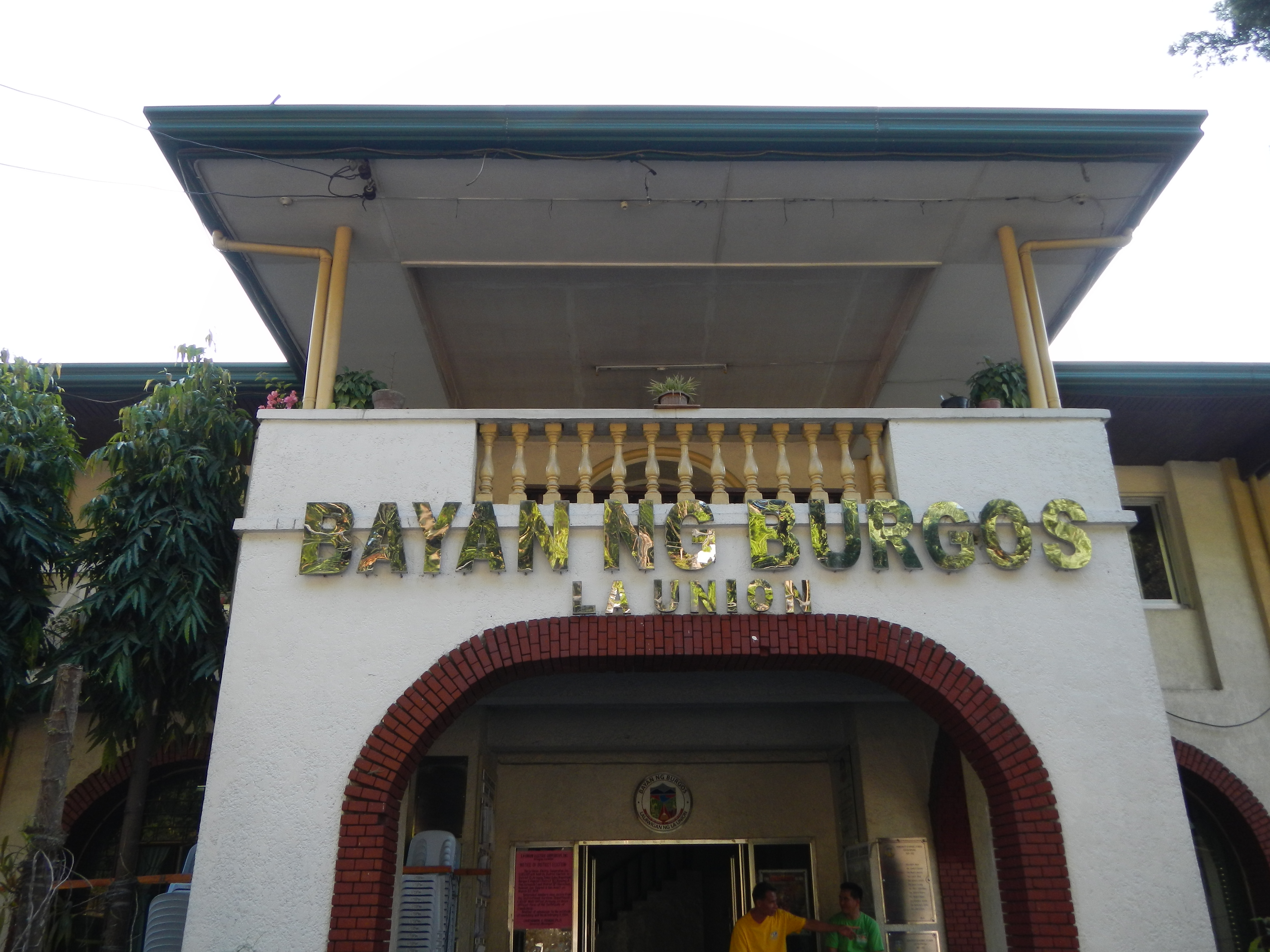
- Bolikewkew Rice Terraces, Church of Our Lady of Fatima, and Burgos Municipal Hall

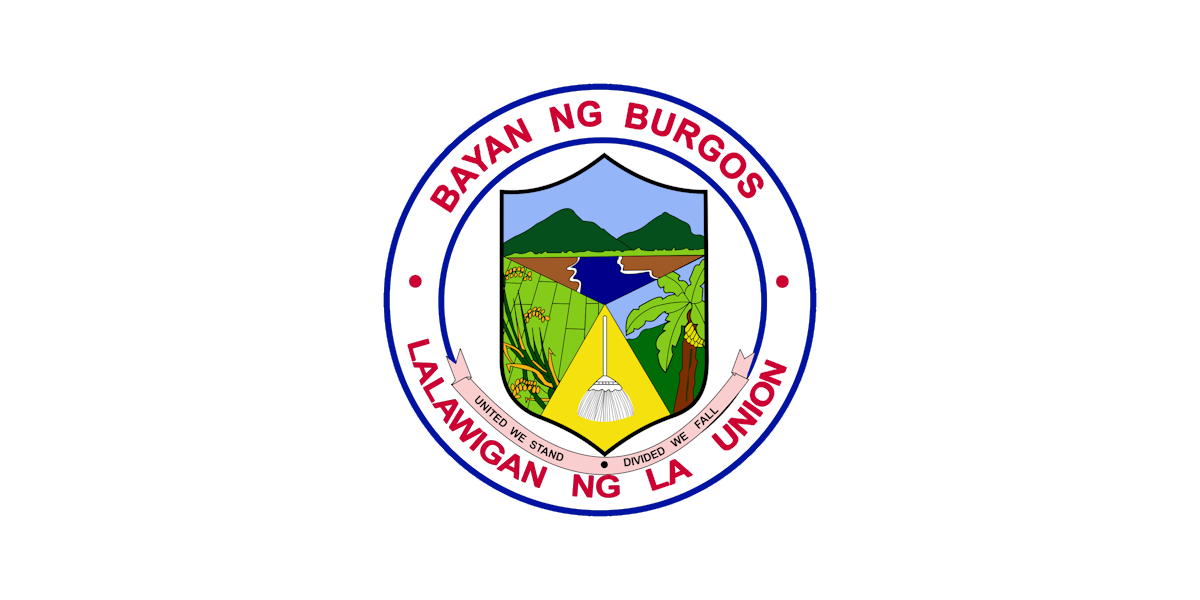
- Flag Seal

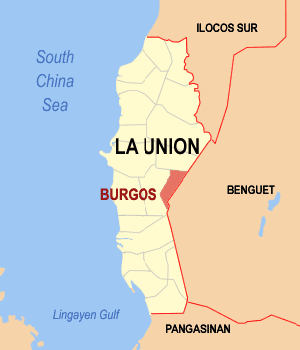
- Map of La Union with Burgos highlighted
- Interactive map of Burgos
- Location within the Philippines
- Coordinates: 16°31′30″N 120°27′30″E
- Country: Philippines
- Region: Ilocos Region
- Province: La Union
- District: 2nd district
- Named for: José Burgos
- Barangays: 12 (see Barangays)

Government
  - Type: Sangguniang Bayan
  - Mayor: Delfin C. Comedis Jr.
  - Vice Mayor: Annie A.Patinglag
  - Representative: Dante S. Garcia
  - Municipal Council: Members: Annie L. Patinglag; Marlon C. Gumba; Efren A. Hidalgo; Edgar L. Sallatic; Rolando A. Cachero; Alano N. Gascon; Silverio C. Juanbe; Betty Jean L. Arsitio
  - Electorate: 6,788 voters (2025)

Area
  - Total: 70.80 km^{2} (27.34 sq mi)
- Elevation: 336 m (1,102 ft)
- Highest elevation: 1,010 m (3,310 ft)
- Lowest elevation: 21 m (69 ft)

Population (2024 census)
  - Total: 9,121
  - Density: 128.8/km^{2} (333.7/sq mi)
  - Households: 2,145

Economy
  - Income class: 4th municipal income class
  - Poverty incidence: 11.01% (2023)
  - Revenue: ₱ 133.5 million (2024)
  - Assets: ₱ 438.8 million (2024)
  - Expenditure: ₱ 110.5 million (2024)
  - Liabilities: ₱ 15.29 million (2024)

Service provider
  - Electricity: La Union Electric Cooperative (LUELCO)
- Time zone: UTC+8 (PST)
- ZIP code: 2510
- PSGC: 0103308000
- IDD : area code: +63 (0)72
- Native languages: Ilocano; Tagalog
- Website: www.burgoslaunion.gov.ph

Burgos, officially the Municipality of Burgos (Ilocano: Ili ti Burgos; Filipino: Bayan ng Burgos), is a municipality in La Union, Philippines, named after the Filipino martyr Father Jose Burgos. According to the 2024 census, it has a population of 9,121 people making it the least populated municipality in the province.

The town is known for its production of colored soft brooms made from tiger grass.

== Etymology ==
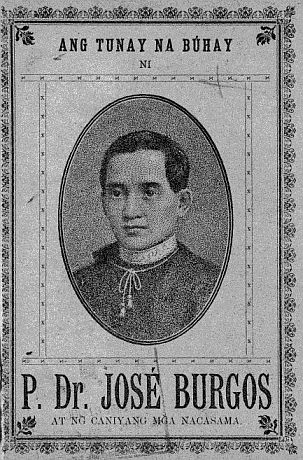
Padre José Burgos

The town was named after Padre José Burgos, a Filipino priest, educator, and nationalist who was a prominent figure in the Philippine movement for independence from Spanish colonial rule. According to local tradition, Padre Burgos sought refuge in the town while fleeing Spanish persecution and officiated a mass at Sitio Domingo in Agpay, leaving a lasting influence in the community.

== History ==
Burgos' early history is closely tied to its Cordilleran (Igorot) inhabitants, including the Ibalois (Mangatibekbek) from Atok and Kapangan in Benguet, and the Kankanaeys (Mangalkali) from Mountain Province in the foothills of the Cordillera Central. These early settlers actively participated in trade along the Aringay Trail, an ancient gold trading route that connected the southwestern Cordillera to the lowlands of northwestern Luzon. Goods such as gold, silk, textiles, rice, porcelain, wax, and earthenware were exchanged with neighboring lowland Ilocano (Samtoy) and Pangasinan communities, as well as with foreign merchants from China, Japan, and Maritime Southeast Asia.

The roots of the settlement trace back to a swampy region known as Desdes or Disdis, a Nabaloi word meaning "to roll up pants or sleeves," which reflected the area's swampy nature. The name referred to the locals' need to wade through the numerous springs, creeks, and rivers that meandered through the region. In the Iloco language, Desdes also means "big spring", emphasizing the importance of water sources in shaping the area's identity.

During the Spanish colonial period in the 1700s, a group of immigrants from Ilocos and Pangasinan settled along the shores of La Union and began migrating to the town of Bauang. Due to population growth, they followed the river's winding path in search of new land and eventually discovered a fertile valley along the riverbank, which they named Naguilian. They continued eastward following the river, to the highland and eventually established the settlement that became present-day Burgos.

At this time, the area was divided into two major ranchería settlements: Rancheria Disdis in the northwest and Rancheria Galiano in the south. Despite their diverse origins, these groups coexisted peacefully, creating a strong sense of community. The integration of highland and lowland cultures contributed to a unique identity that would persist for years.

On February 18, 1839, Naguilian was separated from Bauang, with portions of Burgos, including Disdis (later called "Stancia" by the Spaniards) and areas along the southwestern bank of the Naguilian River, becoming part of the new town. These areas were predominantly inhabited by Igorots.

For much of its early history, the area was part of larger administrative territories in Benguet. However, in 1903, the Philippine Commission passed Act No. 662, which realigned the boundaries between La Union and Benguet. As a result, Rancheria Disdis became part of La Union, while Rancheria Galiano remained under Benguet's jurisdiction. Over the next few decades, the borders were redrawn, and by 1920, Disdis was returned to La Union.

The formation of Burgos as a distinct administrative entity occurred on November 27, 1925, through Executive Order No. 54 issued by Governor-General Leonard Wood. This order created the Municipal District of Burgos under the province of La Union, comprising several barrios: Pappa, Bilis Northwest, Ribsuan, Libtong Norte, and Bayabas West. The district was named in honor of Father José Burgos, a Filipino martyr who, according to local accounts, sought refuge in the area while fleeing Spanish persecution and officiated a mass at Sitio Domingo in Agpay, leaving a lasting impression on the community.

The first municipal president of the district was Don Polon Bentrez, widely regarded as the founder of Burgos. He oversaw the construction of a simple town hall made of bamboo and cogon grass in Barrio Ribsuan (now part of Naguilian). One of his notable contributions was the distribution of land to early settlers, fostering stability and growth in the community. His leadership was cut short in 1929 when he sustained fatal injuries during a boundary inspection in Bantay Siam, a remote area in Barrio Libtong. After his death, his vice president, Don Cornelio Abenes, assumed leadership until 1930, when Don Juan Abellada became the first elected municipal district mayor.

In the 1930s, new barrios were established, including Cauayan, Tumapoc, Linuan, Delles, and Central. When Barrio Ribsuan was later annexed to Naguilian, the seat of government moved to Central. By the late 1960s, the seat of governance was once again relocated, this time to New Poblacion, to accommodate the town's growth and administrative needs. Around the same time, more barrios were formed, including Agpay, Dalacdac (from Cauayan), Imelda (from Libtong), New Poblacion (from Bilis), and Upper Tumapoc (from Tumapoc).

In 1960, Burgos officially transitioned from a municipal district to a regular municipality.

== Geography ==
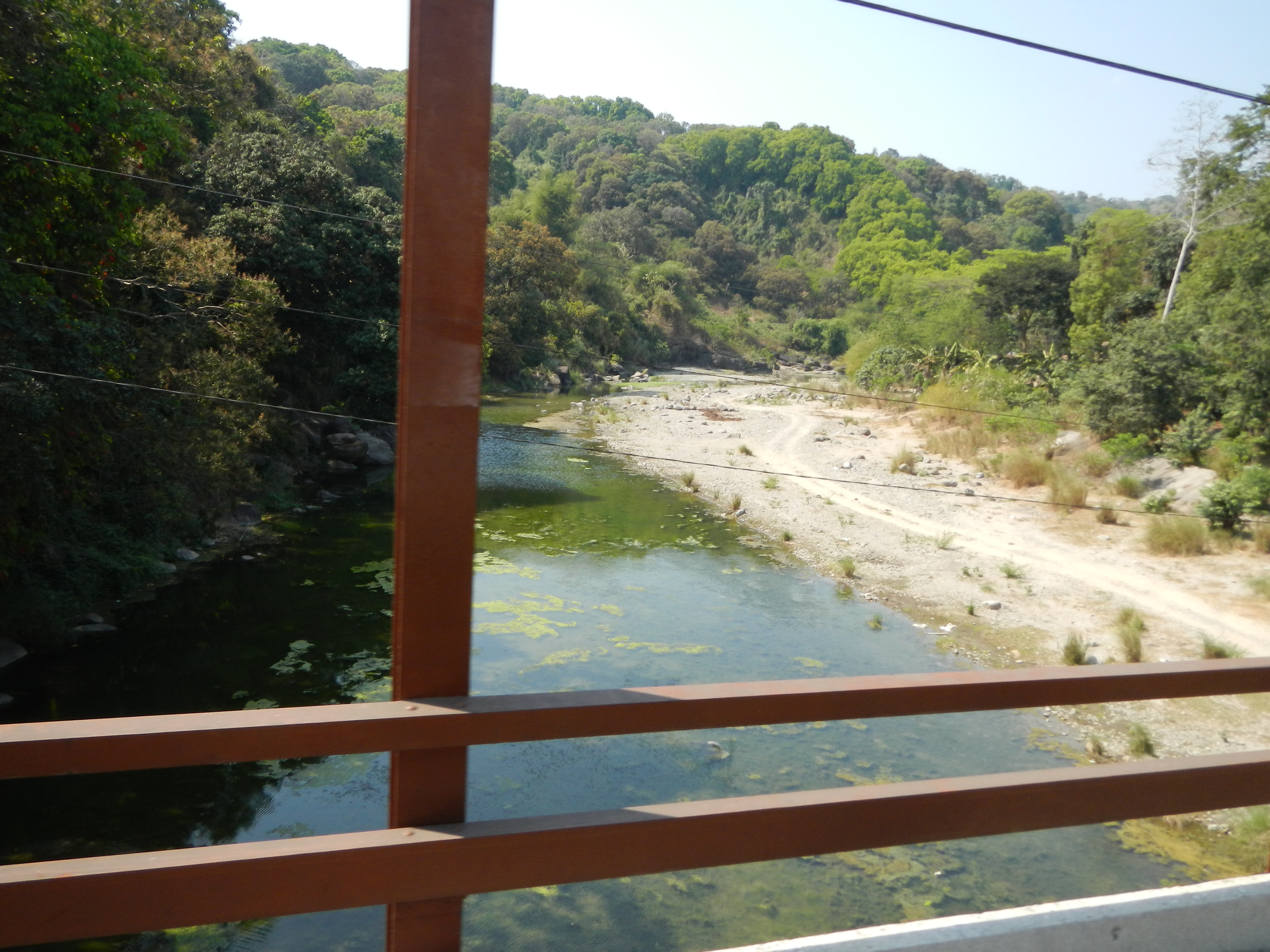
Balili or Naguilian River

The Municipality of Burgos is a landlocked highland municipality characterized predominantly by hilly terrain. It spans a total land area of 7,082 hectares. The municipality is bordered to the north by Bagulin, to the south, to west by Naguilian, and to the east by Sablan in Benguet. The Naguilian River runs through the town, with 11.40 kilometers of riverbanks.

Land classification in Burgos includes 2,307.93 hectares of Alienable and Disposable (A&D) land. In terms of land use, the municipality has 2,263.93 hectares dedicated to agriculture, 43.51 hectares of bare land, 24.11 hectares of grasslands, 114.79 hectares of wetlands, 536.59 hectares of forest areas (507.59 hectares of which are public forests), and 48.81 hectares of built-up areas.

Burgos is situated 30.00 kilometres (18.64 mi) from the provincial capital San Fernando, and 276.05 kilometres (171.53 mi) from the country's capital city of Manila.

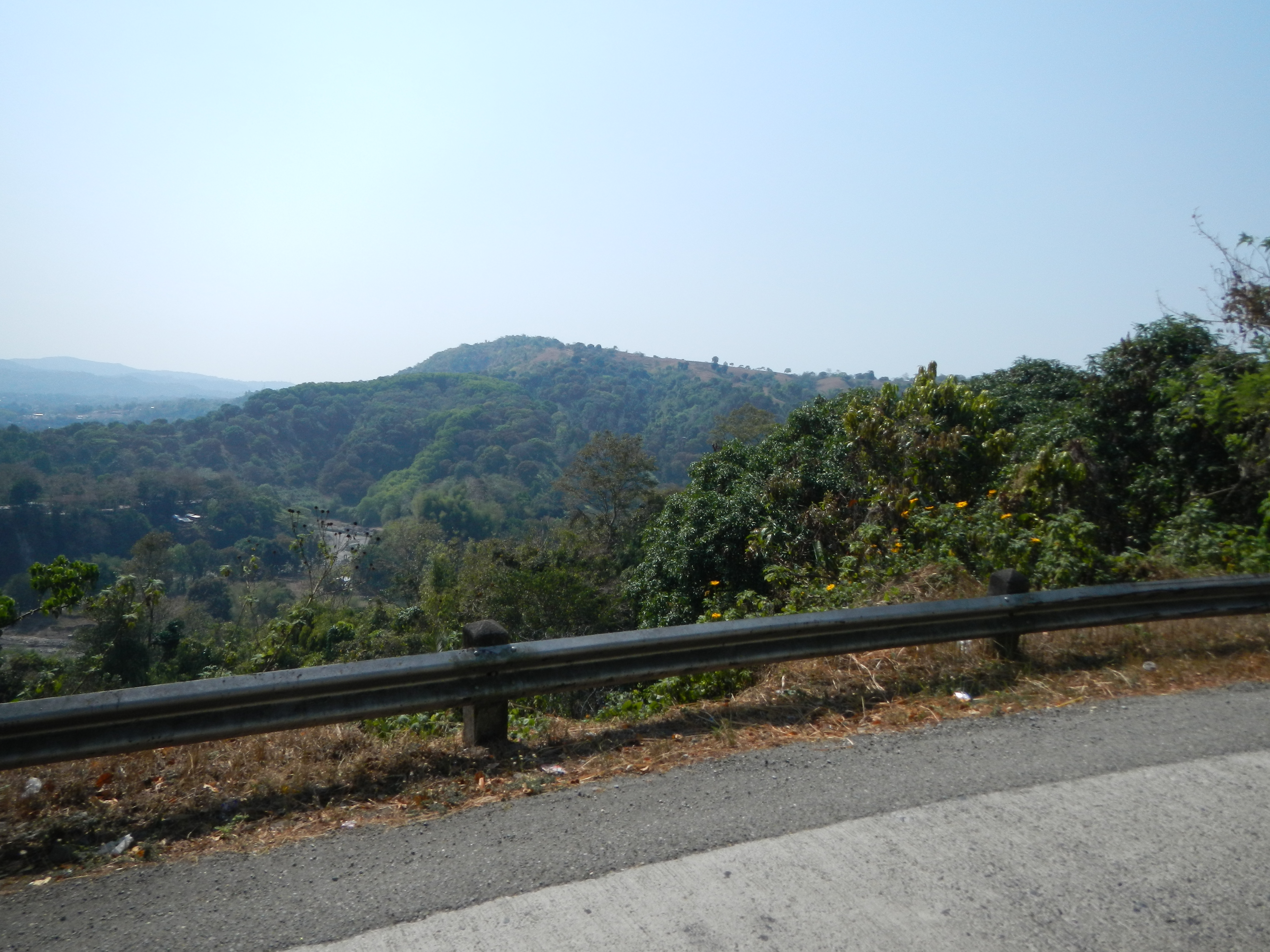
Terrain around the town

=== Barangays ===
Burgos is politically subdivided into 12 barangays, with 9 upland barangays and 3 lowland barangays. Each barangay is further divided into puroks, and some have sitios. Each barangay is led by a Chairman and its Councilors, while the Sangguniang Kabataan, represented by its Councilor, focuses on youth representation.

- Agpay
- Bilis
- Caoayan
- Dalacdac
- Delles
- Imelda
- Libtong
- Linuan
- Lower Tumapoc
- New Poblacion
- Old Poblacion
- Upper Tumapoc

=== Climate ===
The town experiences a Type I climate as defined by the Köppen Climate Classification, which features a clear division between wet and dry seasons. The wet season typically starts around mid-May and continues until late October, while the dry season lasts from December through early May. Heavy rainfall is brought by the Southwest Monsoon (SWM) during the wet season, whereas the Northeast Monsoon (NEM) leads to drier conditions as it moves over the Cordillera Mountains.

Climate data for Burgos, La Union
Month	Jan	Feb	Mar	Apr	May	Jun	Jul	Aug	Sep	Oct	Nov	Dec	Year
Mean daily maximum °C (°F)	28 (82)	29 (84)	30 (86)	31 (88)	29 (84)	29 (84)	27 (81)	27 (81)	27 (81)	28 (82)	29 (84)	28 (82)	29 (83)
Mean daily minimum °C (°F)	18 (64)	19 (66)	21 (70)	23 (73)	23 (73)	23 (73)	23 (73)	23 (73)	23 (73)	22 (72)	20 (68)	19 (66)	21 (70)
Average precipitation mm (inches)	42 (1.7)	48 (1.9)	74 (2.9)	110 (4.3)	269 (10.6)	275 (10.8)	362 (14.3)	325 (12.8)	330 (13.0)	306 (12.0)	126 (5.0)	61 (2.4)	2,328 (91.7)
Average rainy days	11.2	12.0	17.1	21.2	27.1	26.8	28.1	27.0	26.0	24.5	17.7	12.4	251.1
Source: Meteoblue

== Demographics ==
Population census of Burgos
Year	Pop.	±% p.a.
1903	8	—
1918	2,256	+45.66%
1939	1,774	−1.14%
1948	1,348	−3.01%
1960	2,124	+3.86%
1970	3,160	+4.05%
1975	3,570	+2.48%
1980	4,149	+3.05%
1990	5,410	+2.69%
1995	6,086	+2.23%
2000	6,748	+2.24%
2007	8,261	+2.83%
2010	7,850	−1.84%
2015	8,067	+0.52%
2020	9,006	+2.34%
2024	9,121	+0.31%
Source: Philippine Statistics Authority

According to the 2020 Philippine Statistics Authority census, the population of Burgos, La Union, is recorded at 9,006 individuals. The population density is calculated at 130 inhabitants per square kilometer, or 340 inhabitants per square mile.

The growth rate for the town is 1.63% with the largest age group is children aged 5 to 9, while the senior population (70 years and above) is the smallest.

The labor force consists of 5,491 individuals. The poverty incidence in Burgos is reported at 53.15%, with the magnitude of poor families at 34.82% and the magnitude of the poor population at 37.18%.

=== Languages ===
The official language of the town is Iloco, while Ibaloi and Kankanaey are also spoken among the residents.

=== Religion ===
Christianity is the predominant faith, with Roman Catholics being the majority, followed by Iglesia ni Cristo and various other denominations. The literacy rate within Burgos stands at 98.83%. The total number of households in the town is 1,596.

== Education ==
The Burgos Schools District Office governs all educational institutions within the municipality. It oversees the management and operations of all private and public elementary and high schools.

The town has 8 public elementary schools, and 3 public secondary schools.

=== Primary and elementary schools ===
- Agpay Elementary School
- Bilis Elementary School
- Burgos Central Elementary School
- Delles Elementary School
- Libtong Integrated School
- Linuan Elementary School
- Tumapoc Elementary School
- Upper Tumapoc Elementary School

=== Secondary schools ===
- Burgos National High School
- Burgos National High School - Annex
- Libtong Integrated School

== Economy ==
=== Agriculture ===
The town's economy is predominantly centered around agriculture. Fertile land supports a wide range of crops that include rice, root crops, tobacco, corn, pineapples, bananas, and various highland vegetables such as cabbage, carrots, and potatoes. These crops are essential to the livelihood of many residents and serve as the primary source of income. Livestock farming is also part of the local economy, with poultry, pigs, and cattle being raised alongside crops. Additionally, fishing specifically aquaculture, trade, and small-scale industries supplement agricultural activities, contributing to the town's overall economic framework.

=== Industry ===
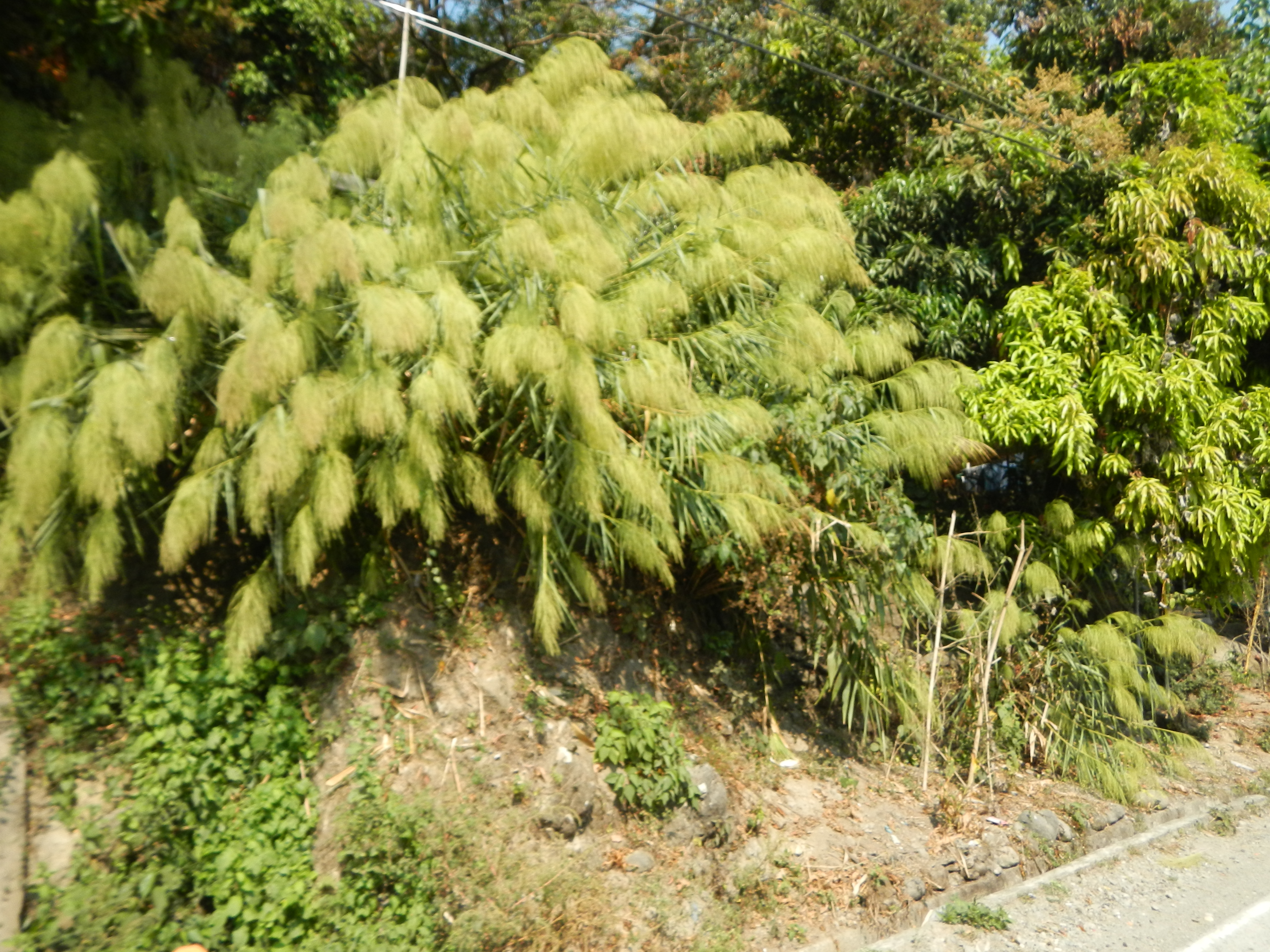
Tiger Grass key essential for making Soft Brooms

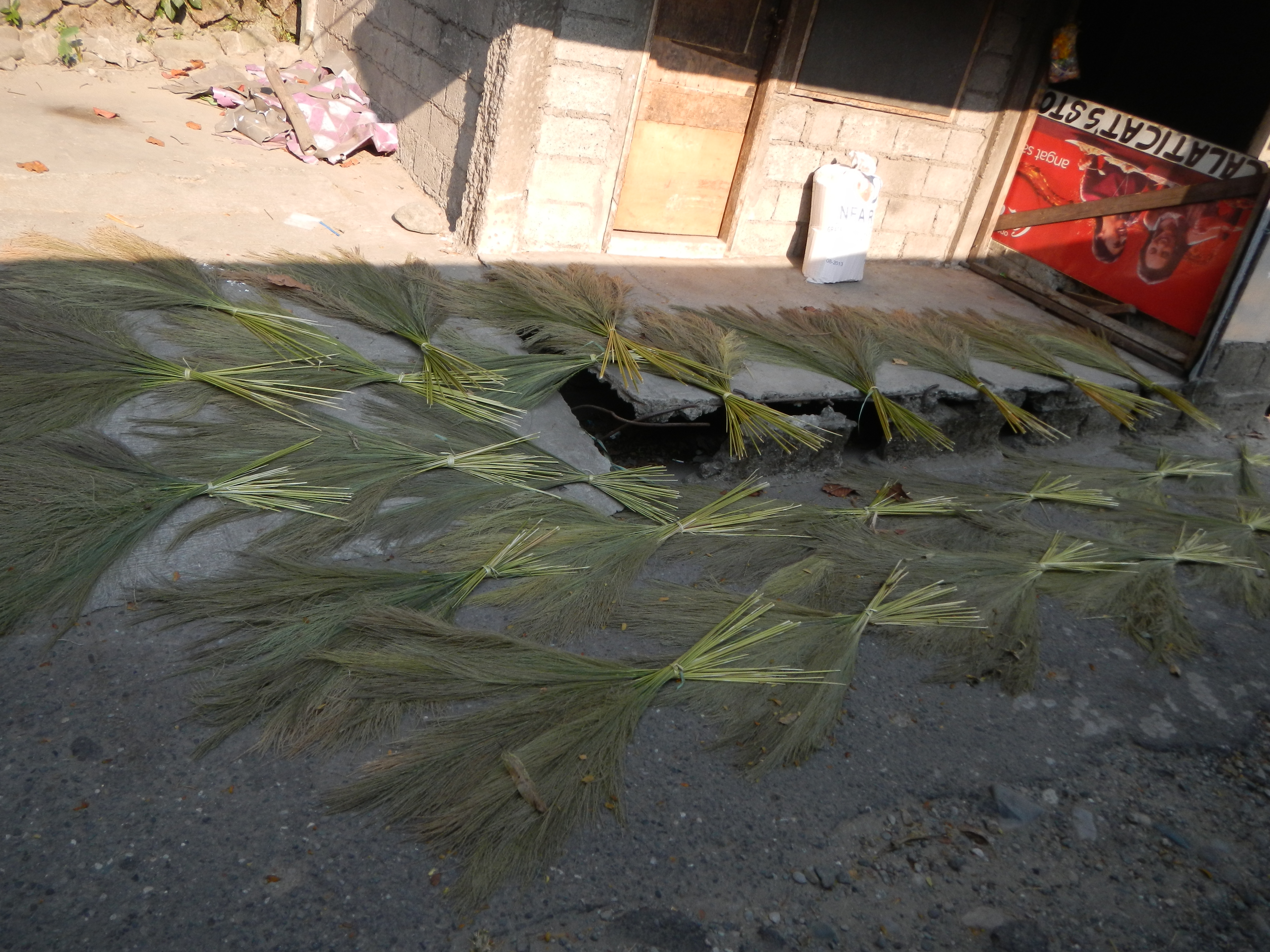
Process of making soft brooms

Burgos is widely known for its soft broom industry, where local artisans craft colorful brooms made from tiger grass, which grows abundantly in the area. The production of these brooms is not just an economic activity but also a cultural tradition, celebrated during the Boyboy Festival held annually from February 21 to 23. Apart from brooms, Burgos is also famous for its traditional rice wine (Tapey), which is locally produced and widely consumed, and for native delicacies like binudbudan. The town has a variety of locally grown fruits available in markets, contributing to local trade. Additionally, handcrafted products such as bamboo, wood, and basket items are made and sold, showcasing the town’s rich cultural heritage in craftsmanship.

=== Employment ===
Agriculture remains the primary source of employment in Burgos, with approximately 96% of the population involved in agricultural activities, whether directly or indirectly. This heavy reliance on agriculture highlights the town's rural economy. Meanwhile, the industrial and services sectors contribute relatively less to employment, with industry accounting for 1.8% and services contributing 2.06% of the workforce. The town faces challenges in diversifying its job market, with a higher concentration of workers in the agricultural sector. The poverty incidence rate in Burgos stands at 10.69% according to the 2021 census, which underscores the economic vulnerabilities faced by many residents.

=== Economic Development ===
In terms of economic development, Burgos faces both opportunities and challenges. According to the 2024 DTI Cities and Municipalities Competitive Index, the town ranks 161st overall with a score of 4.18. However, Burgos has performed relatively well in certain areas, such as local economic growth (60th place) and cost of living (20th place), suggesting that the town has potential for future economic improvements. The town has made strides in productivity (ranked 166th) and the presence of business and professional organizations (44th), indicating progress in supporting business development and financial services. Despite these advances, there are notable challenges in safety compliance (ranked 223rd) and employment generation (ranked 180th), which could hinder further development if not addressed. Continuous efforts are being made to foster a conducive business environment, improve infrastructure, and diversify sources of income.

Poverty incidence of Burgos (%)

Source: Philippine Statistics Authority

=== Tourism ===
Burgos is primarily a transit town but offers some notable attractions. Among its most well known sites are the Bolikewkew Rice Terraces, Imelda Lake, and Dalacdac Dam, which are examples of the local natural landscape.

== Government ==
=== Local government ===
Burgos, belonging to the second congressional district of the province of La Union, is governed by a mayor designated as its local chief executive and by a municipal council as its legislative body in accordance with the Local Government Code. The mayor, vice mayor, and the councilors are elected directly by the people through an election which is being held every three years.

=== Elected officials ===
Members of the Municipal Council (2022 - 2025)
Position	Name
Congressman	Dante S. Garcia
Mayor	Delfin C. Comedis, Jr.
Vice-Mayor	Annie A. Patinglag
Councilors	Mario C. Martinez
Councilors	Efren A. Hidalgo
Councilors	Marlon C. Gumba
Councilors	Dante C. Cabinto
Councilors	Betty Jean L. Arsitio
Councilors	Domingo G. Abansi
Councilors	Alano N. Gascon
Councilors	Daniel N. Nisperos

== Major roads ==
- Naguilian Road

== Gallery ==
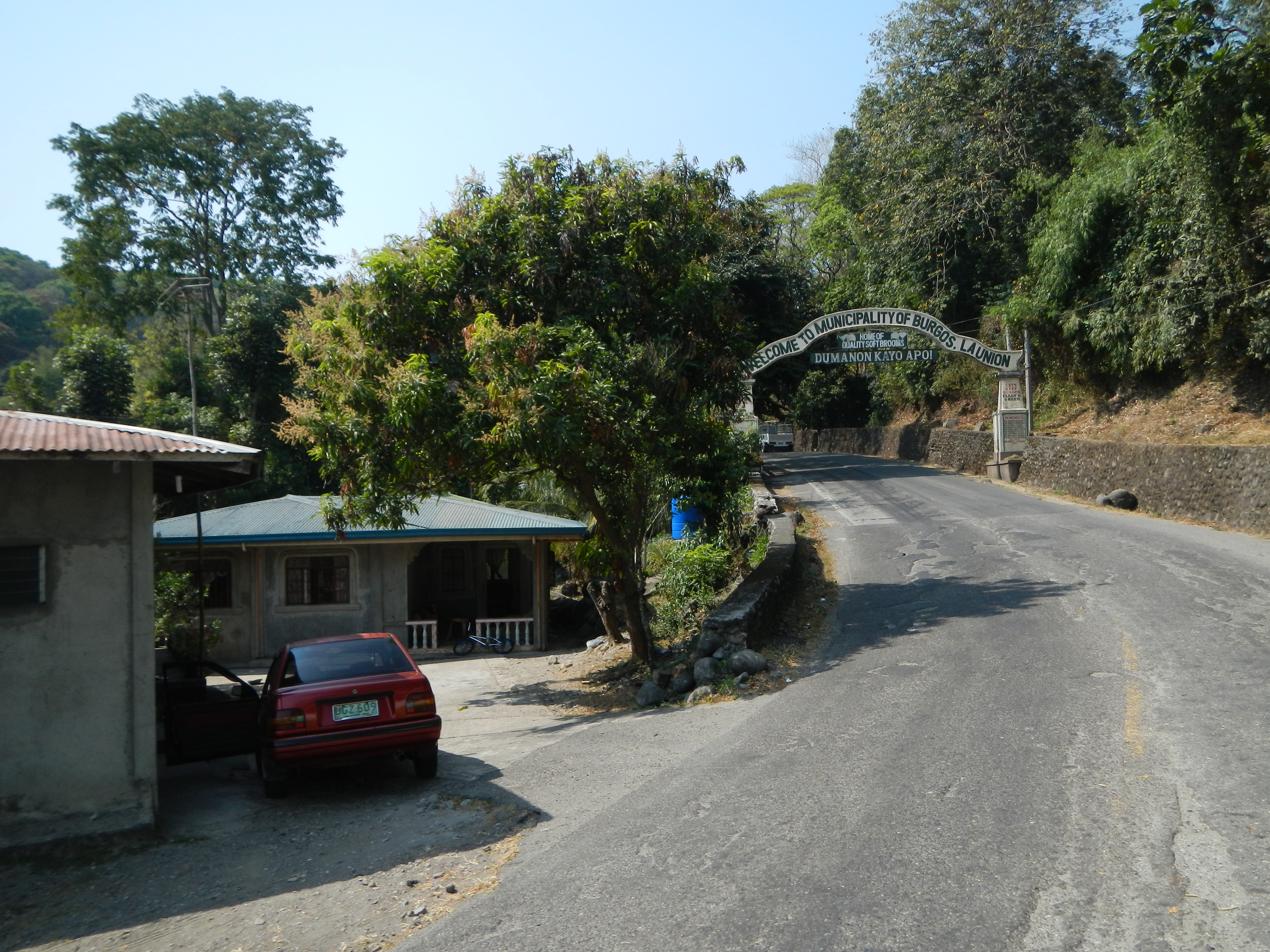
Welcome arch

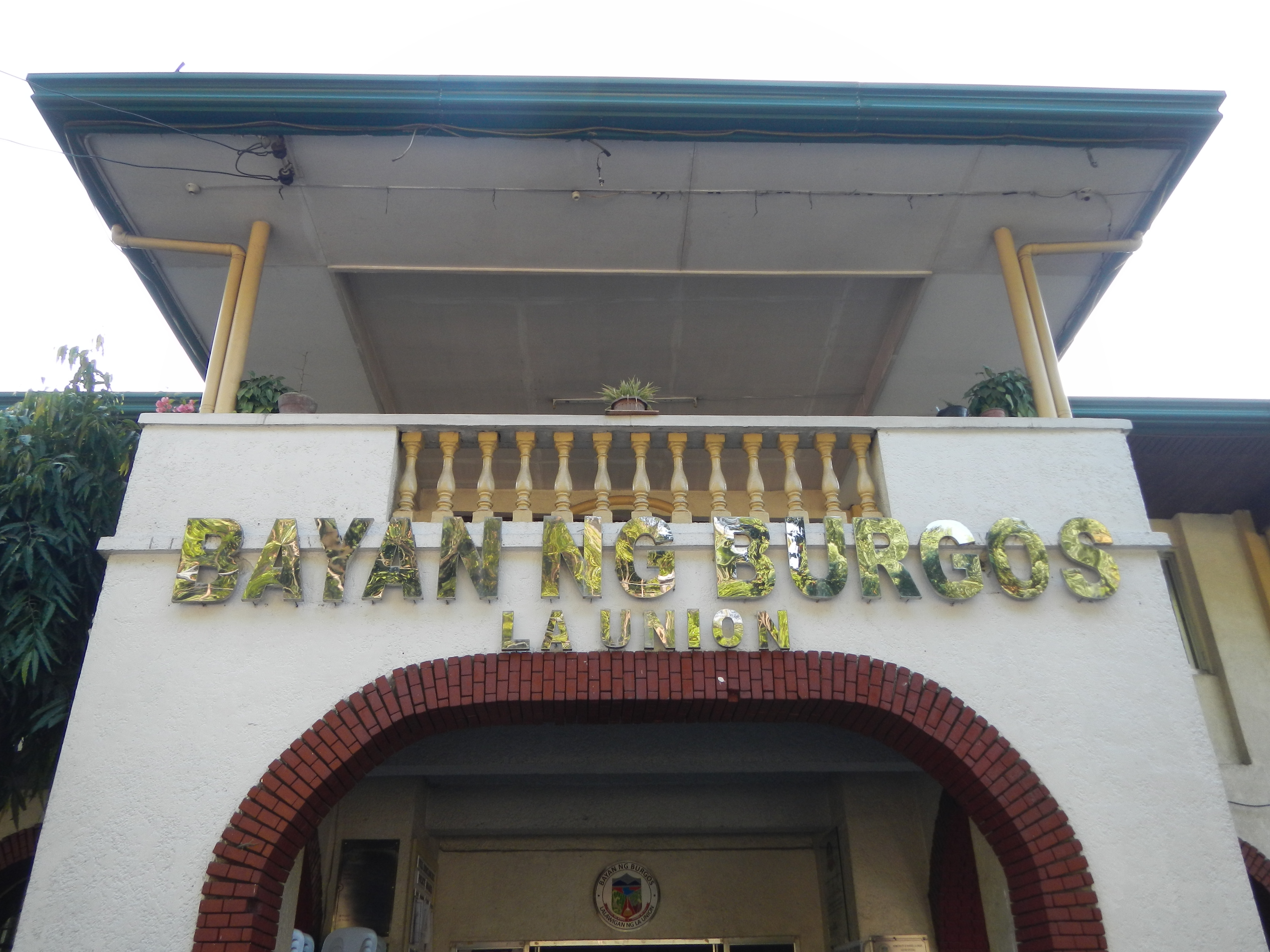
Municipal hall

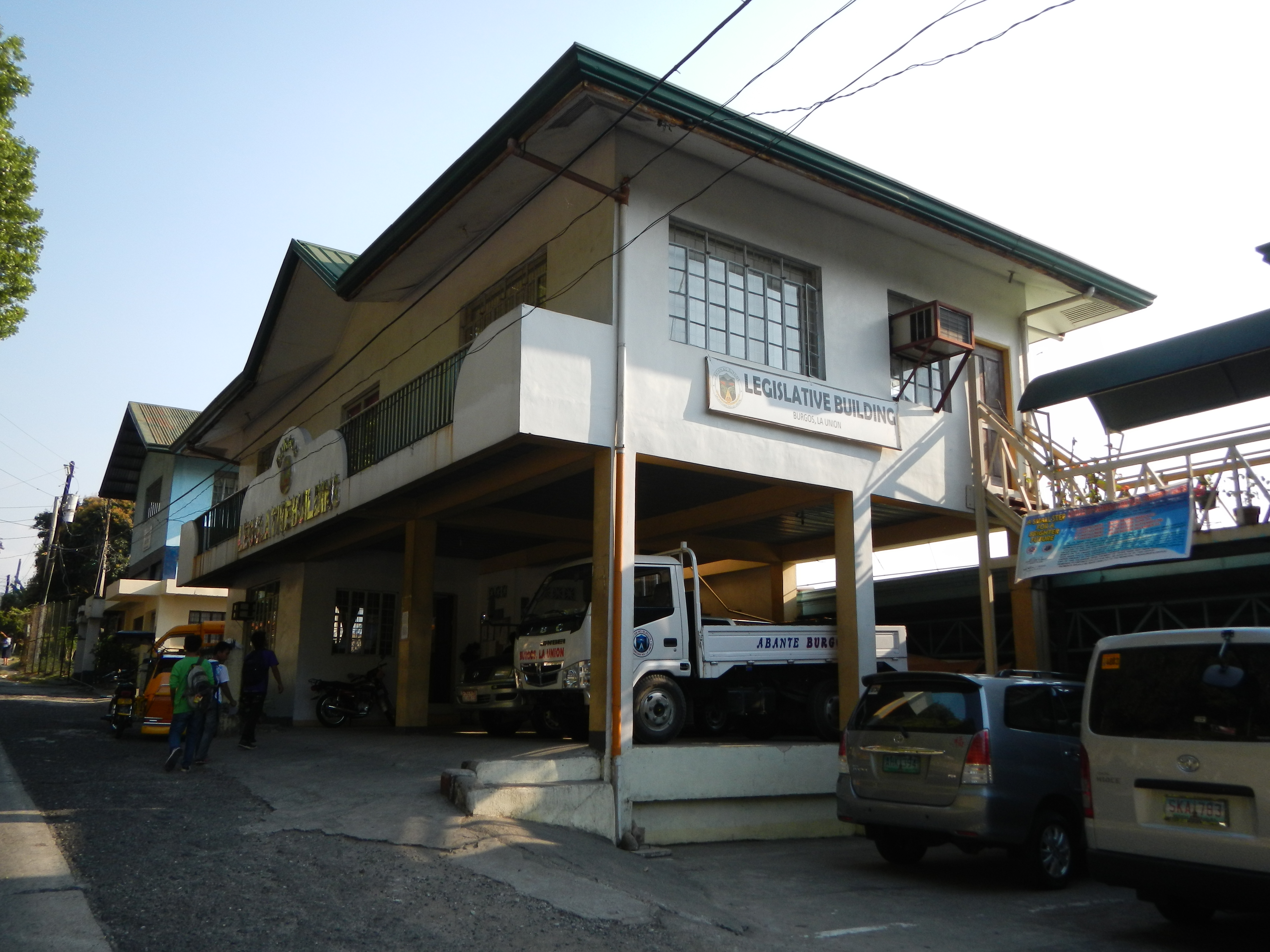
Legislative building

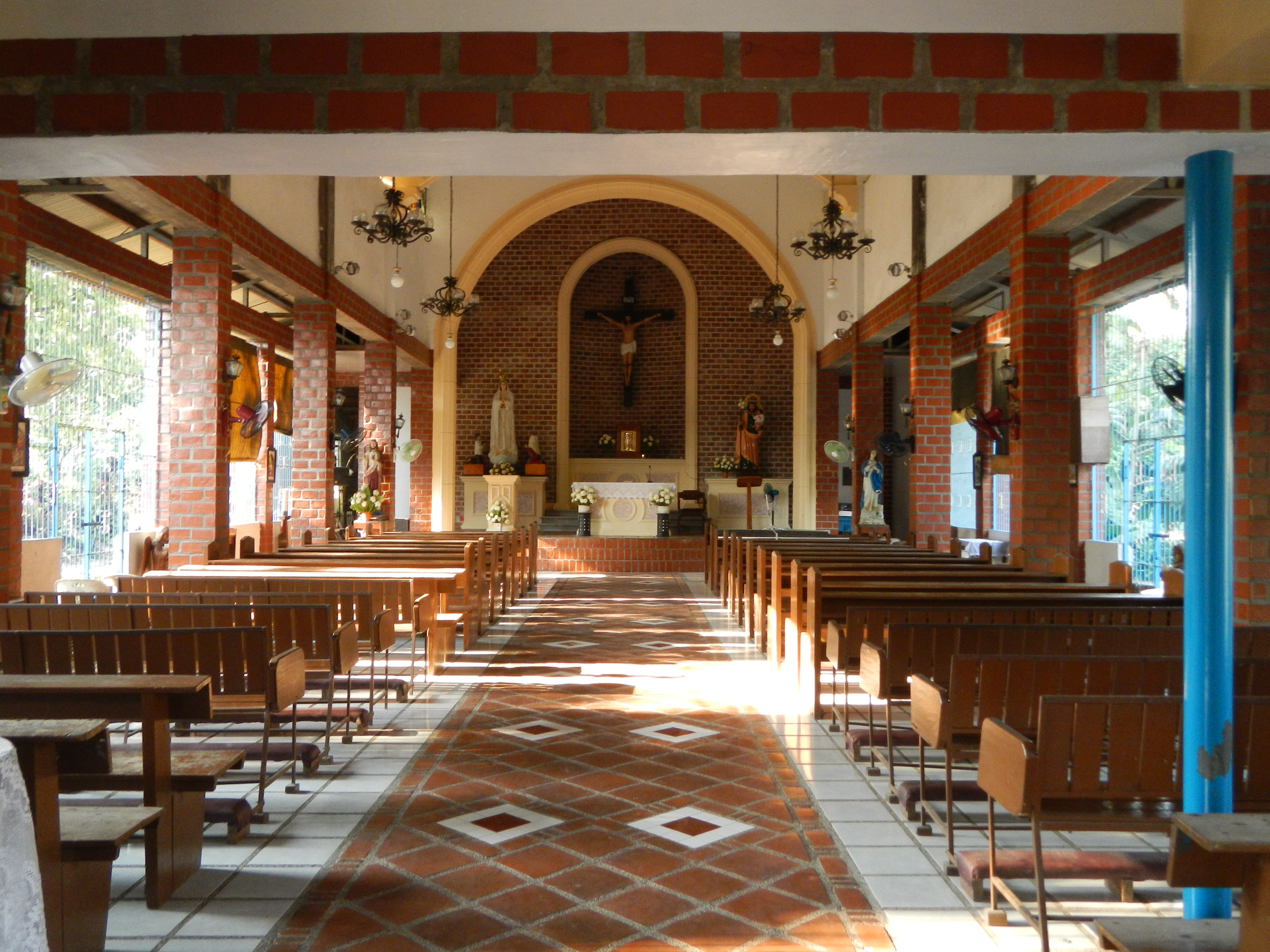
Our Lady of Fatima Parish Church

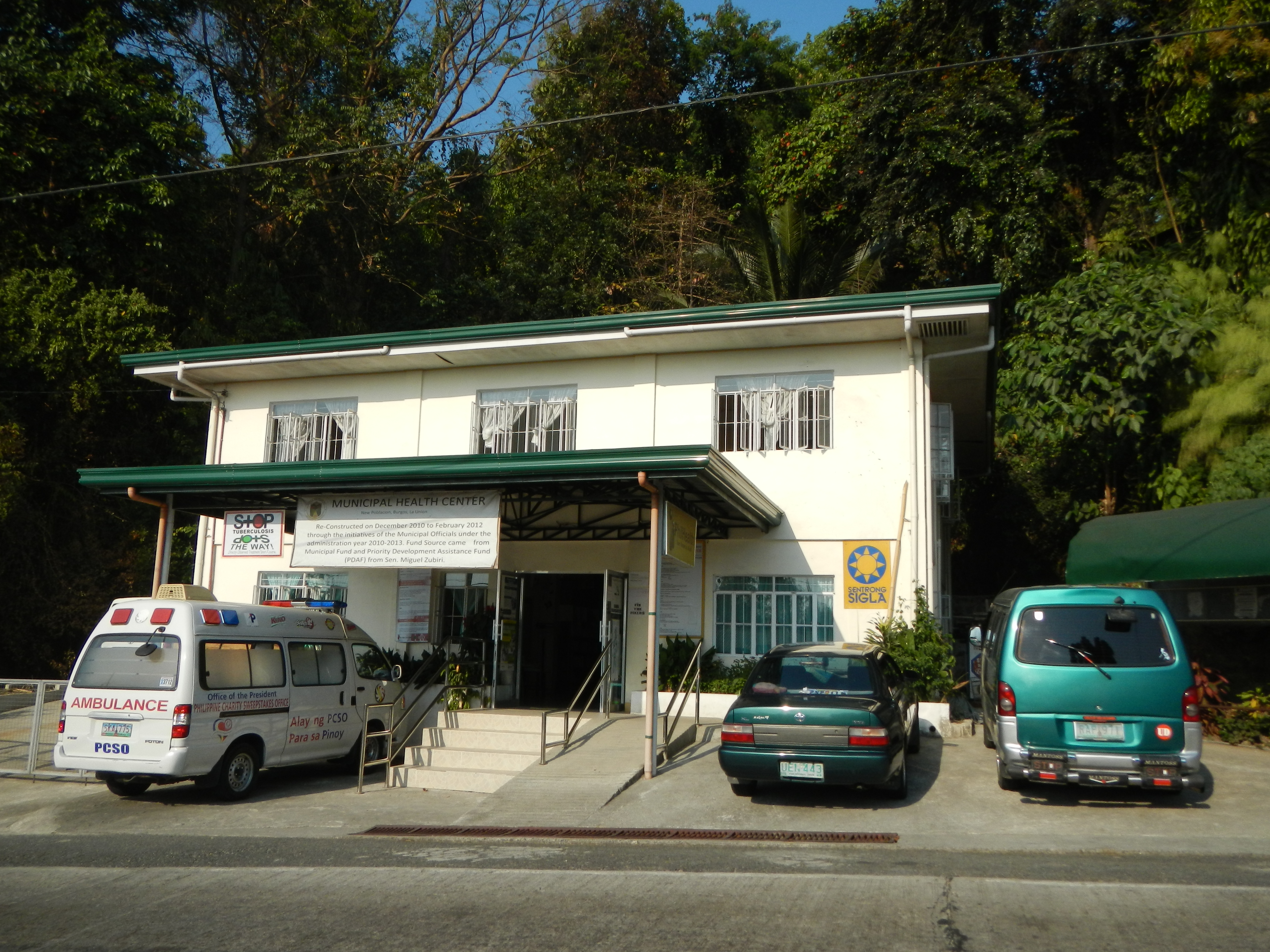
Municipal Health Center

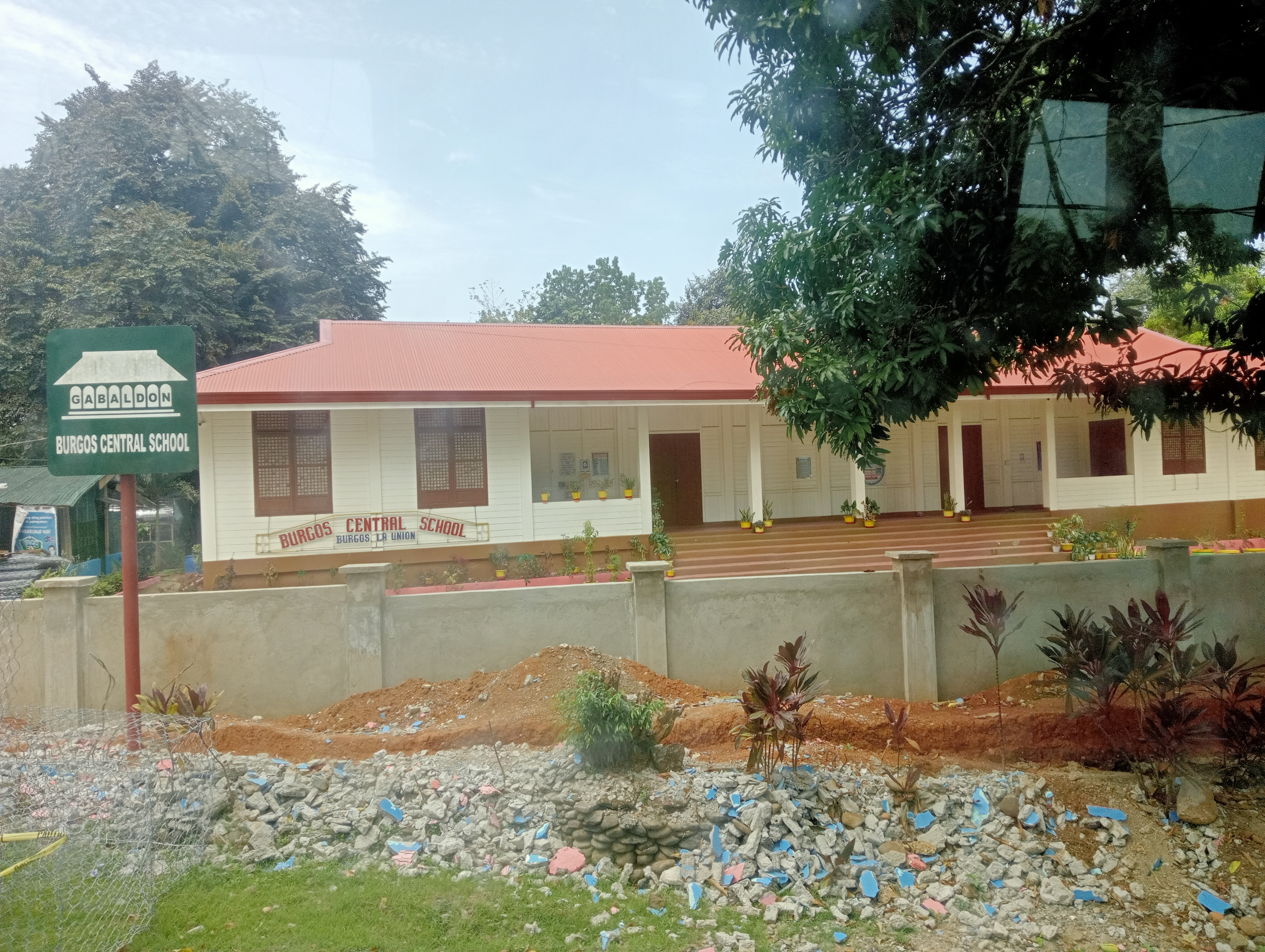
Burgos Central School
