= Bagulin =

Municipality in La Union, Philippines

- Municipality
- Municipality of Bagulin
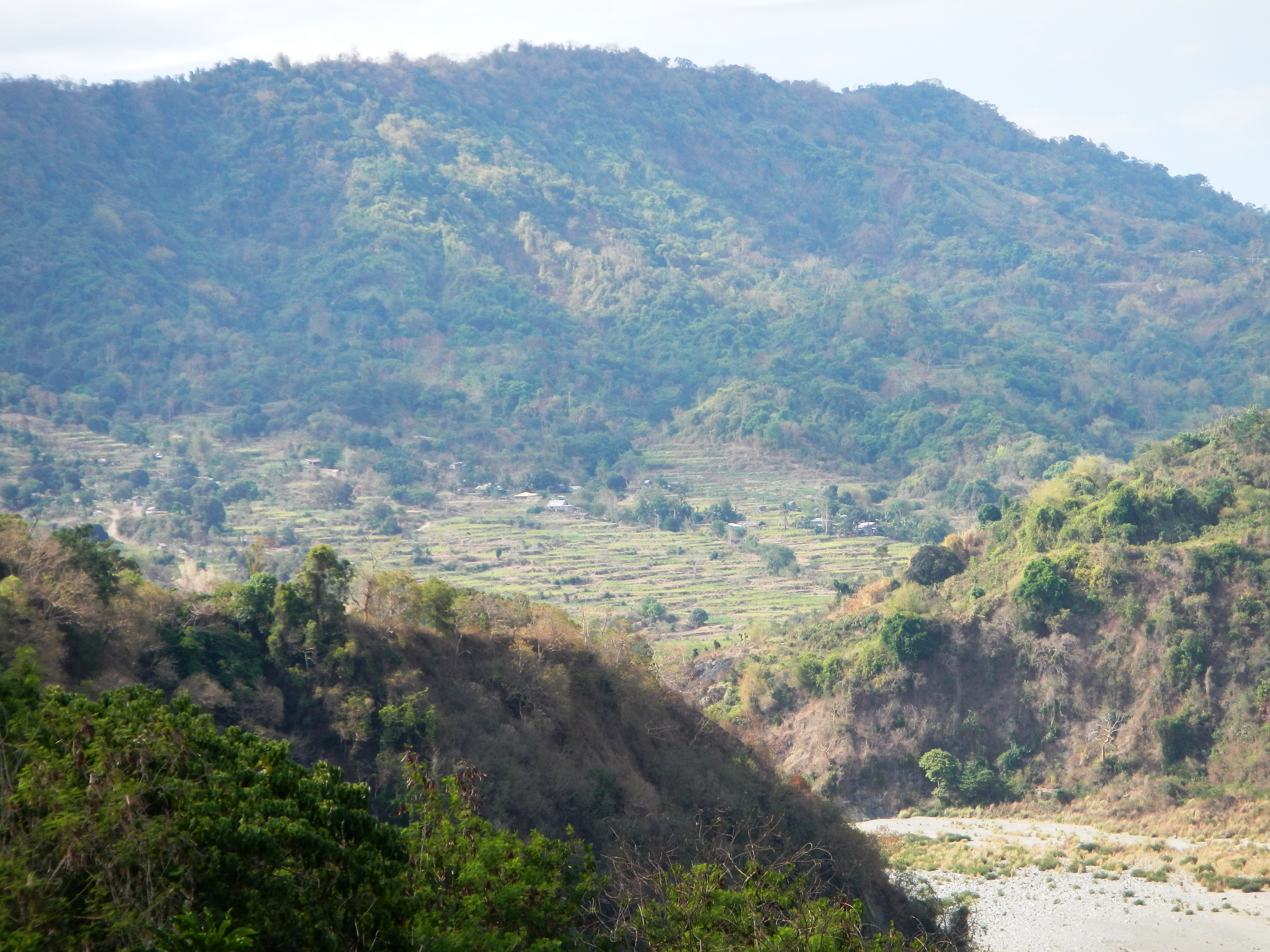
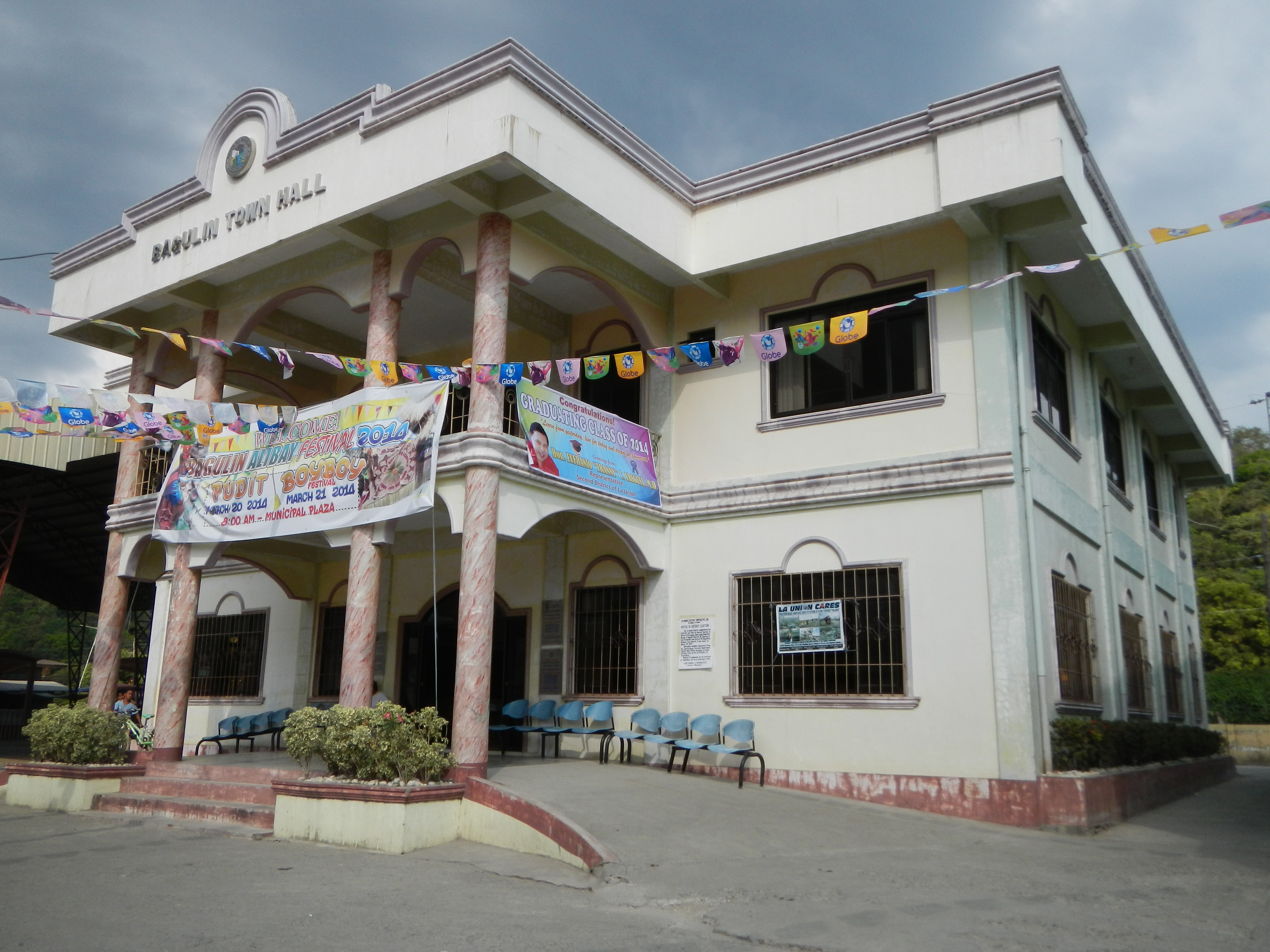
- Bagulin Rice Terraces and Municipal Hall

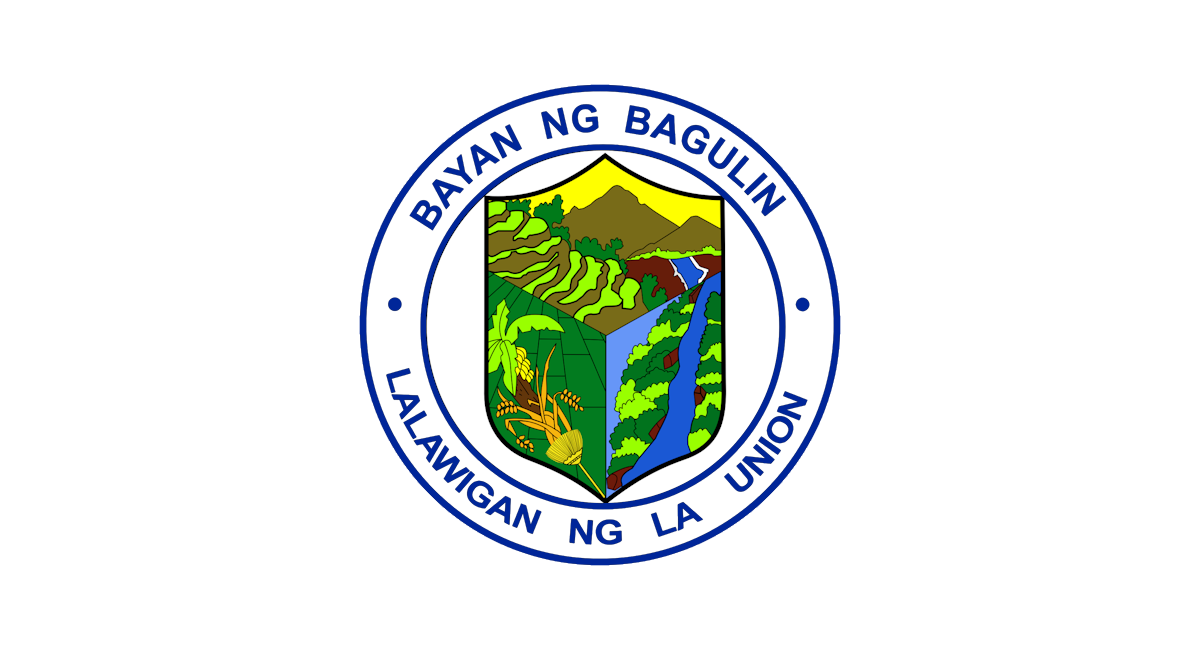
- Flag Seal

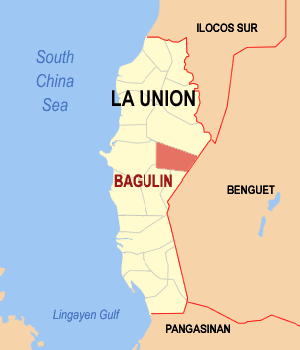
- Map of La Union with Bagulin highlighted
- Interactive map of Bagulin
- Location within the Philippines
- Coordinates: 16°36′28″N 120°26′16″E
- Country: Philippines
- Region: Ilocos Region
- Province: La Union
- District: 2nd district
- Founded: 1963
- Barangays: 10 (see Barangays)

Government
  - Type: Sangguniang Bayan
  - Mayor: Virgilio C. Flor
  - Vice Mayor: Jaime A. Lictao
  - Representative: Dante S. Garcia
  - Municipal Council: Members: Ferdinand D. Tumbaga; Eduardo R. Compas; Warton E. Sacpa; Joel E. Nang-is; Natalia R. Mazon; Romeo B. Sallatic; Prescila D. Dumaguing; Juanito C. Badbadaoi
  - Electorate: 9,942 voters (2025)

Area
  - Total: 107.33 km^{2} (41.44 sq mi)
- Elevation: 282 m (925 ft)
- Highest elevation: 885 m (2,904 ft)
- Lowest elevation: 28 m (92 ft)

Population (2024 census)
  - Total: 14,434
  - Density: 134.48/km^{2} (348.31/sq mi)
  - Households: 3,341

Economy
  - Income class: 4th municipal income class
  - Poverty incidence: 16.38% (2023)
  - Revenue: ₱ 150.6 million (2024)
  - Assets: ₱ 663.4 million (2024)
  - Expenditure: ₱ 139.1 million (2024)
  - Liabilities: ₱ 141.8 million (2024)

Service provider
  - Electricity: La Union Electric Cooperative (LUELCO)
- Time zone: UTC+8 (PST)
- ZIP code: 2512
- PSGC: 0103304000
- IDD : area code: +63 (0)72
- Native languages: Ilocano; Tagalog; Kankanaey
- Website: www.bagulin.gov.ph

Bagulin, officially the Municipality of Bagulin (Ilocano: Ili ti Bagulin; Filipino: Bayan ng Bagulin), is a landlocked, Highland municipality in La Union, Philippines. According to the 2024 census, it has a population of 14,434 people.

Bagulin is well-known for its broom-making industry, particularly its high-quality soft brooms.

== Etymology ==
The name Bagulin originates from a local folklore about Bago and Ulin. According to folklore, Bago, an Igorot highlander, traveled westward from the uplands after observing a bluish crystal near the coast. Upon reaching the area, he encountered Ulin, a lowland maiden, who was struggling in the waves. Displaying courage, Bago rescued her, and the two fell in love.

Despite their cultural differences and the disapproval of Ulin's family, Bago and Ulin eloped and settled in the area now known as Bagulin. They had a son, whom they named Bagulin, combining their names as a symbol of their union.

Bagulin grew up to become the first chieftain of the community, then referred to as "Allabok." His leadership was characterized by tribal victories and efforts to unify the local population, earning him widespread respect. After his death, the settlement was renamed Bagulin in his honor, with the approval of Spanish authorities.

== History ==
=== Early history ===
Bagulin traces its origins to the settlements of the Igorot people, predominantly the Kankanaeys, who were known for their prosperous agricultural practices and vibrant animistic culture, reflecting their profound ancestral heritage. By the mid-18th century, the area that would become Bagulin formed part of the township of Allabok, located on the moderate slopes of the mountains overlooking the South China Sea.

The community actively engaged in trade, exchanging commodities such as gold, rice, jars, wax, and woven products with neighboring groups, including the Ilocanos, Ibalois, and Pangasinans, as well as distant traders from Maritime Southeast Asia, Japan and China.

=== Spanish Colonial Period ===
During the Spanish colonization in the 1700s, portions of what is now Bagulin and Naguilian were under the jurisdiction of Bauang and governed through the encomienda system. This system entrusted local inhabitants to Spanish encomenderos, friars, and native nobles in exchange for tribute and governance.

By February 1839, Naguilian became a town, and parts of Bagulin, which were predominantly inhabited by Igorots, were originally part of Naguilian under the province of Pangasinan.

=== American Colonial Period ===
The significant transformation of Bagulin began in 1903 during the American colonial period, when a parliamentary government was instituted. This change ushered in the establishment of institutional facilities and the introduction of formal education. A bamboo community hall with a cogon grass roof was constructed, symbolizing the progress of the community. During this period, Bagulin was placed under the jurisdiction of the Mountain Province, a sub-province of Benguet. The community was subsequently relocated to Picdel, a narrow valley strip along the Naguilian-Bagulin River, which provided a more suitable environment for settlement and development.

In 1918, an agreement between Governor Guzman of the Mountain Province and Governor Pio Ancheta of La Union designated Bagulin as a municipal district of Burgos within La Union, marking a significant change in its governance structure. In 1922, the Mountain Province officially relinquished Bagulin to La Union, though it continued to function as a municipal district for several more decades.

The administrative landscape of Bagulin changed further in 1928 when the community center was relocated to a nearby settlement known as Suyo, which is now the present-day Poblacion. The former community center, named Nangalisan (meaning “an abandoned place” in Ilocano), was left behind as settlers from Naguilian, primarily Ilocanos, moved in to improve Suyo. During this period, a bamboo chalet was constructed to serve as the administrative hall, housing a simple governance structure that comprised a mayor, a secretary-treasurer, and a policeman.

=== Full Municipal Status ===
Bagulin was converted on June 25, 1963 into a regular municipality by virtue of Executive Order No. 42, issued by President Diosdado Macapagal. This made Bagulin the 20th municipality of La Union.

== Geography ==
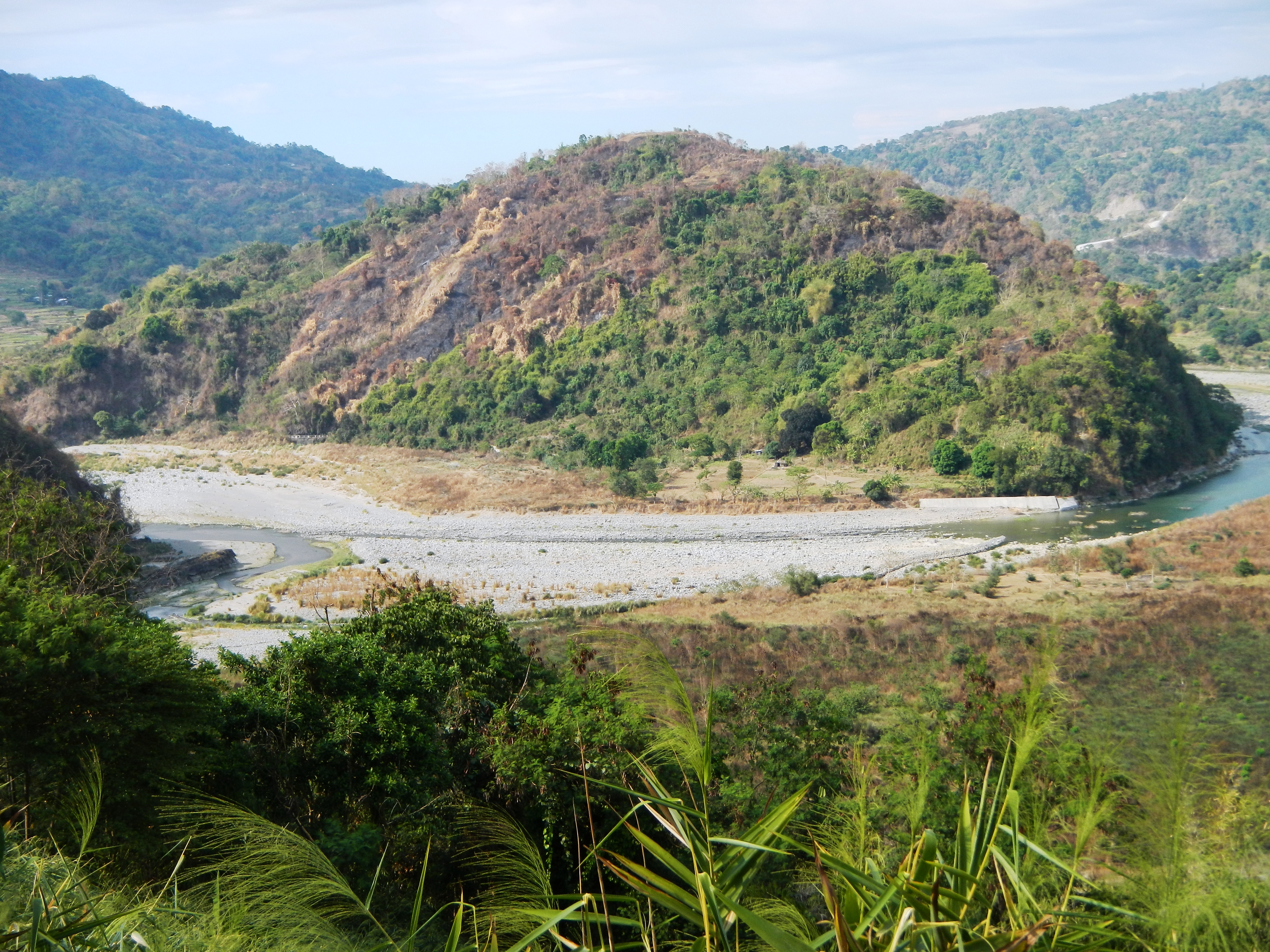
Bagulins' terrain and the Balili River

Bagulin is a landlocked municipality located in the easternmost part of the province of La Union, Philippines. It is geographically bordered by several towns: to the north by San Gabriel, to the northwest by San Juan, to the west by San Fernando, to the southeast by Naguilian, to the south by Burgos, and to the east by Kapangan in the province of Benguet.

The municipality is characterized by its predominantly hilly and mountainous terrain, which is heavily forested. The Balili (Naguilian) River traverses the town, providing a natural waterway that supports its agricultural and ecological landscape. Bagulin is also home to several natural attractions, including Loslosi Falls and Cardiz Spring, as well as numerous creeks and streams.

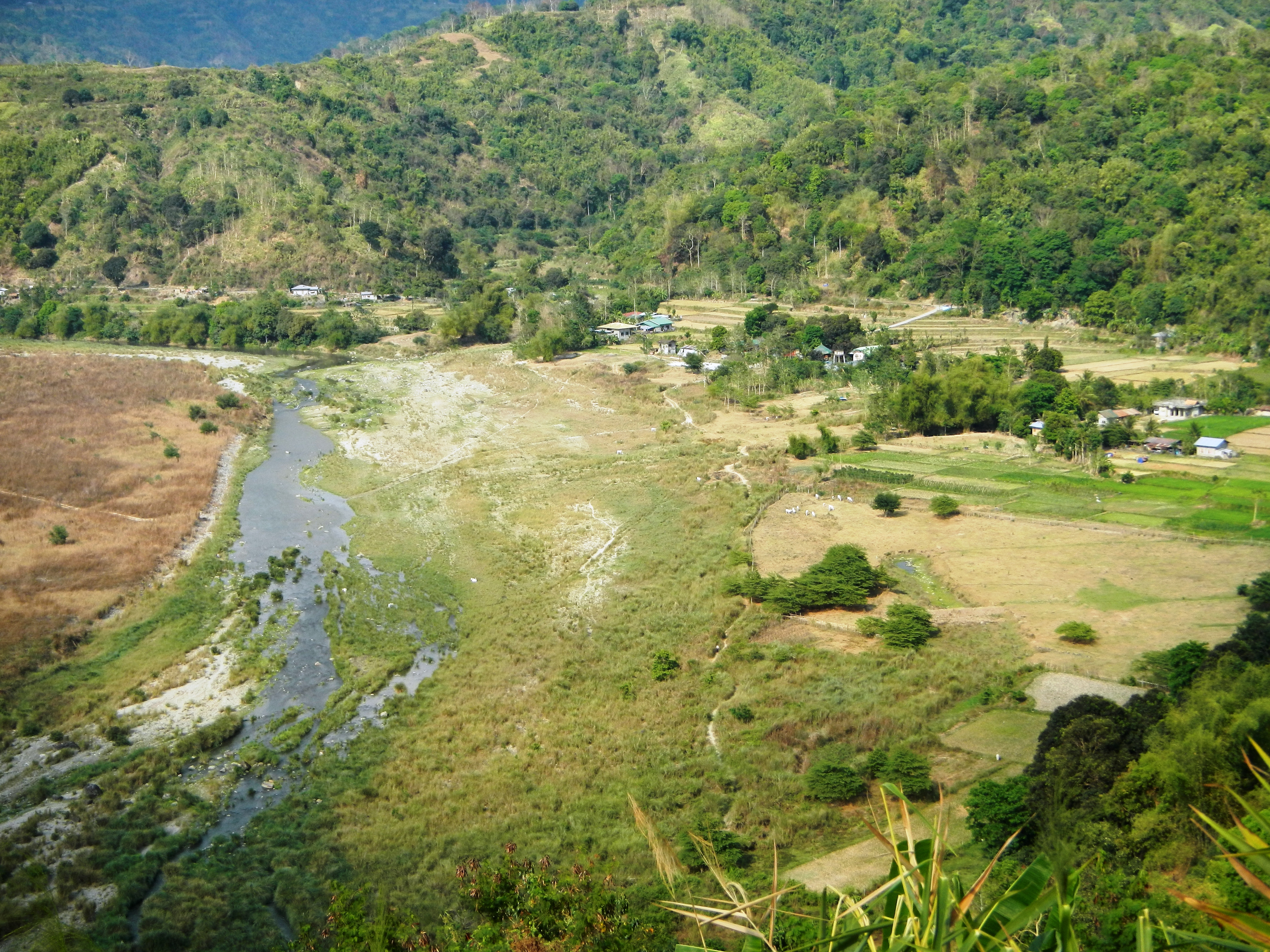
Bagulin River also known as Naguilian or Balili River

Accessibility to Bagulin is primarily through the Naguilian-Bagulin Road or F. Ortega Highway in San Fernando, which connects it to neighboring towns. The town is serviced by various modes of transportation and can be reached via Naguilian.

Bagulin is situated 23.00 kilometres (14.29 mi) from the provincial capital San Fernando, and 277.93 kilometres (172.70 mi) from the country's capital city of Manila.

=== Barangays ===
Bagulin is divided into 10 barangays, each consisting of puroks, and some also include sitios, with most classified as rural based on the 2020 census. Each barangay is governed by a Barangay Chairman along with its Councilors. The youth are represented by the Sangguniang Kabataan, with its Councilor responsible for addressing youth-related concerns.

- Alibangsay
- Baay
- Cambaly
- Cardiz
- Dagup
- Libbo
- Suyo (Poblacion)
- Tagudtud
- Tio-angan
- Wallayan

=== Climate ===
The town has a Type I climate according to the Köppen Climate Classification, characterized by distinct wet and dry seasons. The wet season usually begins in mid-May and lasts until the end of October, while the dry season spans from December to early May. During the wet season, the Southwest Monsoon (SWM) brings heavy rainfall, whereas the Northeast Monsoon (NEM) contributes to relatively dry conditions as it passes over the Cordillera Mountains.

Climate data for Bagulin, La Union
Month	Jan	Feb	Mar	Apr	May	Jun	Jul	Aug	Sep	Oct	Nov	Dec	Year
Mean daily maximum °C (°F)	30 (86)	31 (88)	32 (90)	33 (91)	32 (90)	31 (88)	30 (86)	29 (84)	30 (86)	31 (88)	31 (88)	30 (86)	31 (88)
Mean daily minimum °C (°F)	21 (70)	22 (72)	23 (73)	25 (77)	26 (79)	25 (77)	25 (77)	25 (77)	25 (77)	24 (75)	23 (73)	21 (70)	24 (75)
Average precipitation mm (inches)	42 (1.7)	48 (1.9)	74 (2.9)	110 (4.3)	269 (10.6)	275 (10.8)	362 (14.3)	325 (12.8)	330 (13.0)	306 (12.0)	126 (5.0)	61 (2.4)	2,328 (91.7)
Average rainy days	11.2	12.0	17.1	21.2	27.1	26.8	28.1	27.0	26.0	24.5	17.7	12.4	251.1
Source: Meteoblue

== Demographics ==
Population census of Bagulin
Year	Pop.	±% p.a.
1918	2,419	—
1939	3,584	+1.89%
1948	3,101	−1.60%
1960	4,407	+2.97%
1970	5,338	+1.93%
1975	6,423	+3.78%
1980	7,009	+1.76%
1990	9,418	+3.00%
1995	10,780	+2.56%
2000	11,857	+2.06%
2007	12,521	+0.75%
2010	12,590	+0.20%
2015	13,456	+1.27%
2020	14,428	+1.48%
2024	14,434	+0.01%
Source: Philippine Statistics Authority

Based on the 2020 census data from the Philippine Statistics Authority, the municipality of Bagulin has a total population of 14,428 individuals. This equates to a population density of 130 residents per square kilometer (340 per square mile), with an average density of 159.3 inhabitants per square kilometer. The population is distributed between 7,564 males and 6,861 females, revealing a slightly higher proportion of males in the area.

In terms of age structure, the population is broken down into three major groups: 27.7% (4,002 individuals) belong to the younger age group of 0–14 years old, indicating a relatively youthful population. The majority of the population, 65.4% (9,438 people), fall within the working-age group of 15–64 years old, which is a significant proportion of the population and reflects the labor force potential of the municipality. Meanwhile, the elderly population aged 65 and above accounts for 6.8% (985 individuals), a smaller yet important demographic group. Notably, the age group with the highest concentration is 10–19 years old, comprising 2,697 individuals, indicating a substantial number of adolescents and young adults in Bagulin.

=== Ethnicity and language ===
Bagulin is predominantly home to Indigenous Peoples (IPs), specifically the Bago and Kankanaey groups, who make up 85% of the total population, amounting to 11,539 individuals. This cultural distinction highlights the deep-rooted indigenous heritage and traditions within the community. The languages commonly spoken in Bagulin include Iloco and Kankanaey, reflecting the cultural diversity and multilingual nature of the municipality.

=== Religion ===
Roman Catholicism is the dominant faith in the area, underscoring the strong Catholic influence on the town’s social and cultural life. The religious landscape is an integral aspect of the town's identity, shaping community events, traditions, and social practices.

== Education ==
The Bagulin Schools District Office governs all private and public schools within the municipality of Bagulin. It oversees the management and operations of all educational institutions.

The municipality has 13 public elementary schools and 5 public secondary schools.

=== Primary and elementary schools ===
- Alibangsay Elementary School
- Baay Integrated School
- Bagulin Central Elementary School
- Cambaly Elementary School
- Cardiz Elementary School
- Dagup Integrated School
- Libbo Elementary School
- Lower Wallayan Elementary School
- Papayo Elementary School
- Pila Elementary School
- Sinabugan Elementary School
- Tagudtud Elementary School
- Tio-angan Elementary School
- Upper Wallayan Elementary School

=== Secondary schools ===
- Baay Integrated School
- Cambaly National High School
- Dagup Integrated School
- Suyo National High School
- Tagudtud National High School

== Economy ==
=== Agriculture ===
Bagulin’s economy is primarily driven by agriculture, with residents cultivating a variety of crops such as rice, corn, vegetables, root crops, and fruit-bearing trees like mangoes and bananas. The town’s cooler climate also supports the growth of highland crops, including cabbage, carrots, snap beans, potatoes, and taro. Livestock farming, particularly poultry, pigs, and cattle, supplements local incomes, further diversifying the town’s agricultural base.

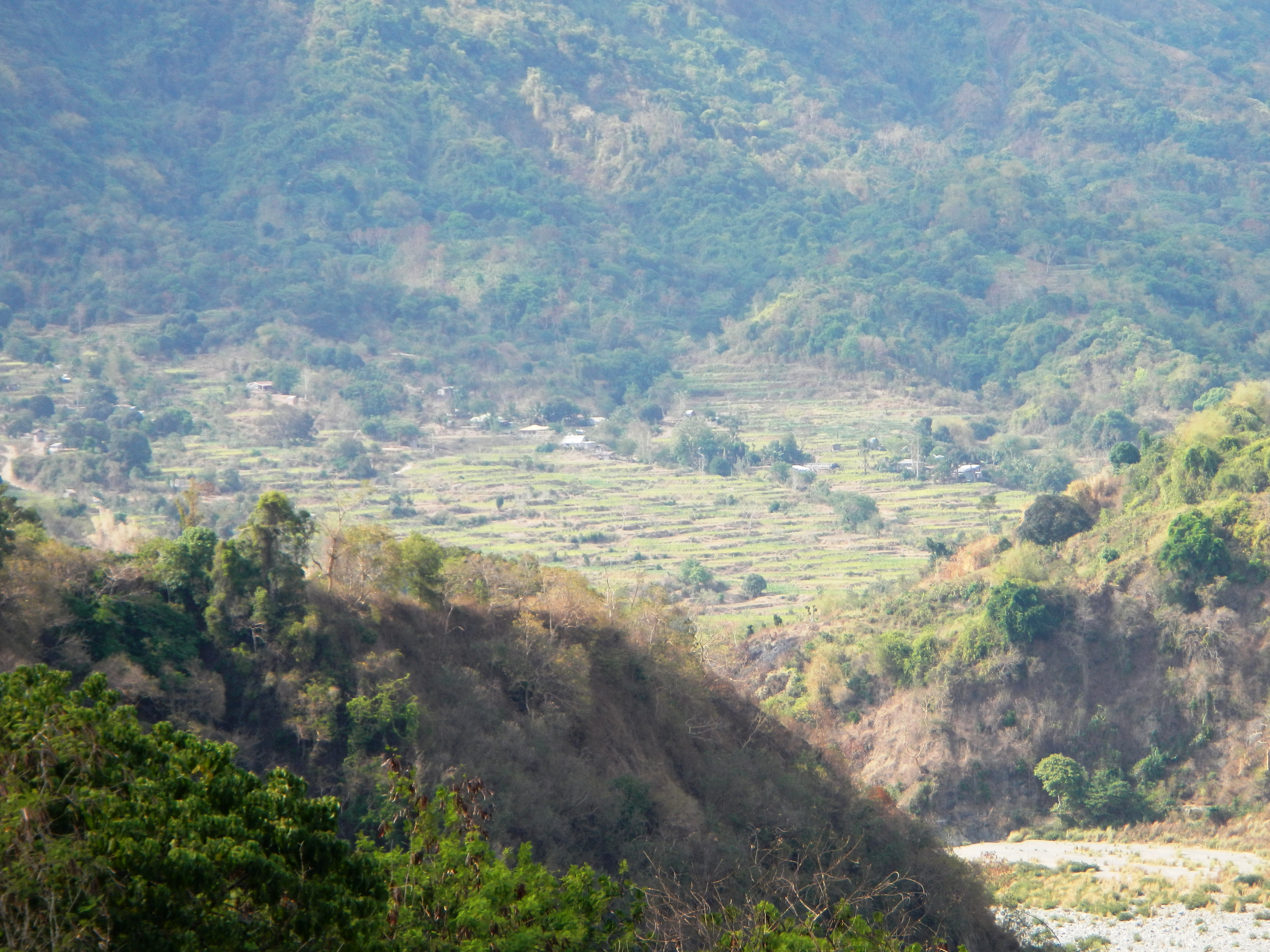
Rice Terraces along Bagulin

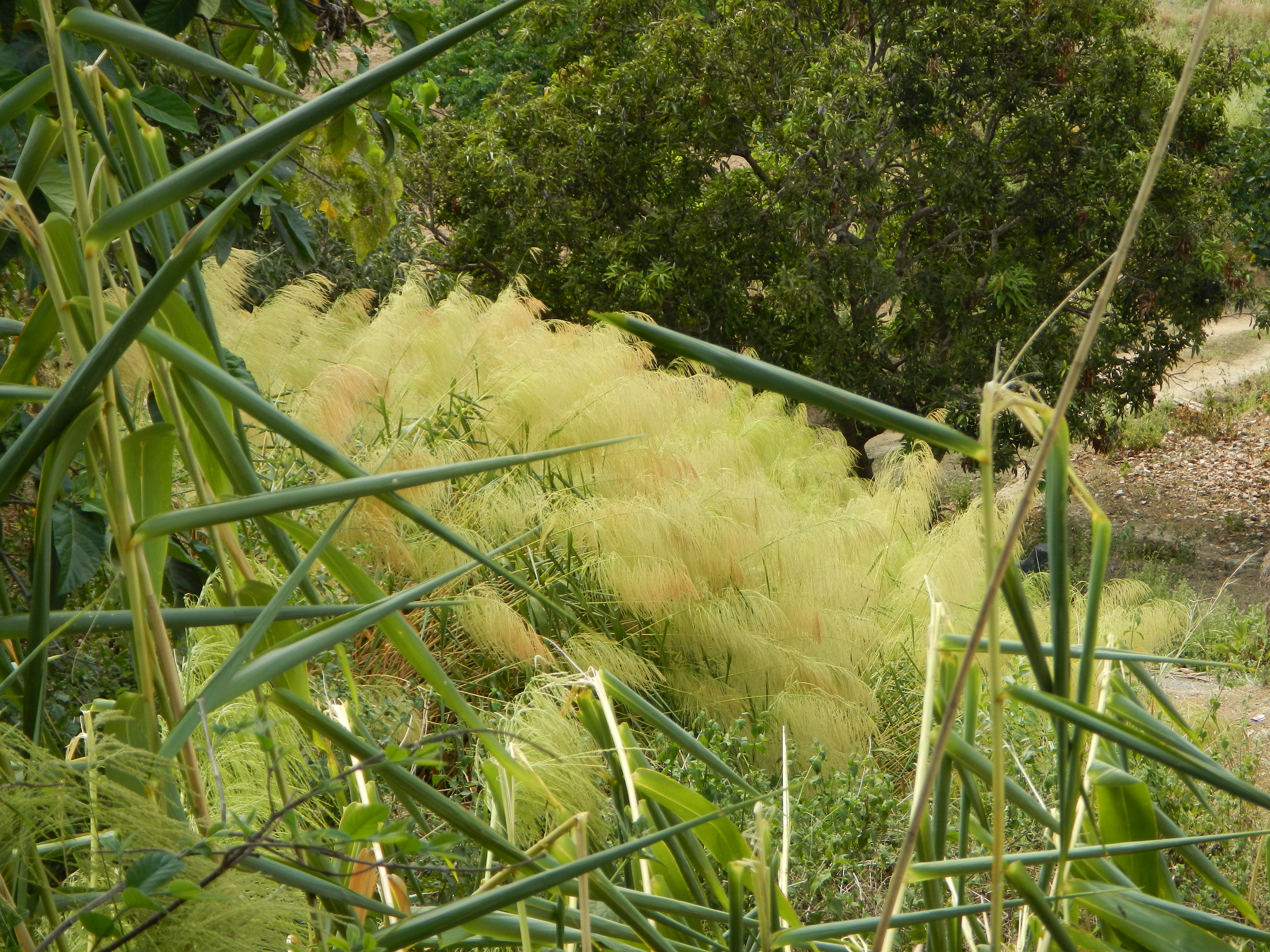
Tiger grass used in making soft brooms

=== Industries ===
Bagulin is renowned for its soft broom industry, producing brooms made from tiger grass, which is abundant in the town. This product has gained recognition as a local specialty and serves as the town’s "One Town, One Product" (OTOP). In addition to soft brooms, Bagulin is also known for producing tapuy, a traditional rice wine, as well as basketry made from bamboo and wood carving. These industries highlight the town’s rich craftsmanship and agricultural heritage, contributing to its unique cultural identity and local economy.

=== Tourism ===
The town's scenic natural landscapes, including the Kudal Peoples' Park, Cardiz Natural Spring and Loslosi Falls, have spurred the growth of eco-tourism, attracting visitors for hiking and other outdoor activities. In 1977, Allabok, Bagulin, where burial caves and hanging coffins are found, was declared a National Cultural Treasure, further adding to the town's cultural significance. These natural and historical landmarks play an important role in Bagulin’s growing tourism sector.

=== Infrastructure ===
On the infrastructure front, Bagulin excels in Education and Local Government Unit (LGU) Investment, both ranking 9th, showcasing strong local government support in these areas. Its Health Infrastructure also ranks 14th, highlighting another strength. However, the town faces challenges related to Distance to Ports (142nd) and Availability of Basic Utilities (222nd), which can limit access to essential services and hinder business growth and overall development.

=== Performance ===
Poverty incidence of Bagulin (%)

Source: Philippine Statistics Authority

According to the 2024 DTI Cities and Municipalities Competitive Index, Bagulin demonstrates a mixed performance in both economic and infrastructure indicators. In Economic Dynamism, the town ranks well, securing the 20th spot for Employment Generation among 5th to 6th class municipalities, indicating effective job creation. It also ranks moderately in Cost of Living (50th), reflecting affordability. However, Bagulin ranks lower in Active Establishments (161st) and Local Economy Growth (99th), suggesting fewer businesses and slower economic expansion.

== Government ==
=== Local government ===
Bagulin, belonging to the second congressional district of the province of La Union, is governed by a mayor designated as its local chief executive and by a municipal council as its legislative body in accordance with the Local Government Code. The mayor, vice mayor, and the councilors are elected directly by the people through an election which is being held every three years.

=== Elected officials ===
Members of the Municipal Council (2019–2022)
Position	Name
Congressman	Sandra Y. Eriguel
Mayor	Virgilio C. Flor
Vice-Mayor	Jaime A. Lictao
Councilors	Ferdinand D. Tumbaga
Councilors	Eduardo R. Compas
Councilors	Warton E. Sacpa
Councilors	Joel E. Nang-is
Councilors	Natalia R. Mazon
Councilors	Robeo B. Sallatic
Councilors	Prescila D. Dumaguing
Councilors	Juanito C. Badbadaoi

== National Cultural Treasure ==
The town is home to one National Cultural Treasure of the Philippines, which is the Burial Caves of Sitio Alabok in Barangay Cambaly.

== Gallery ==
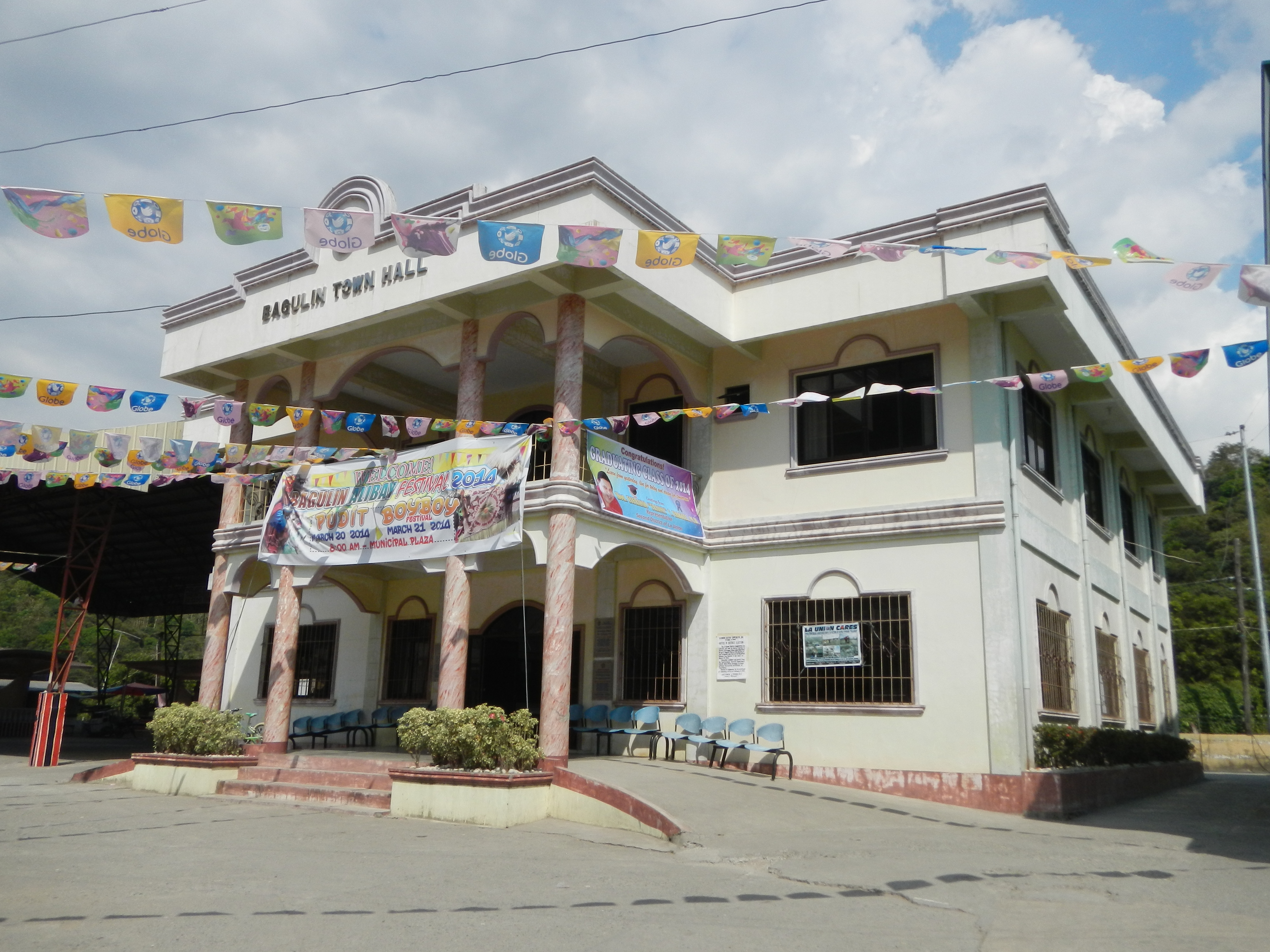
Municipal hall

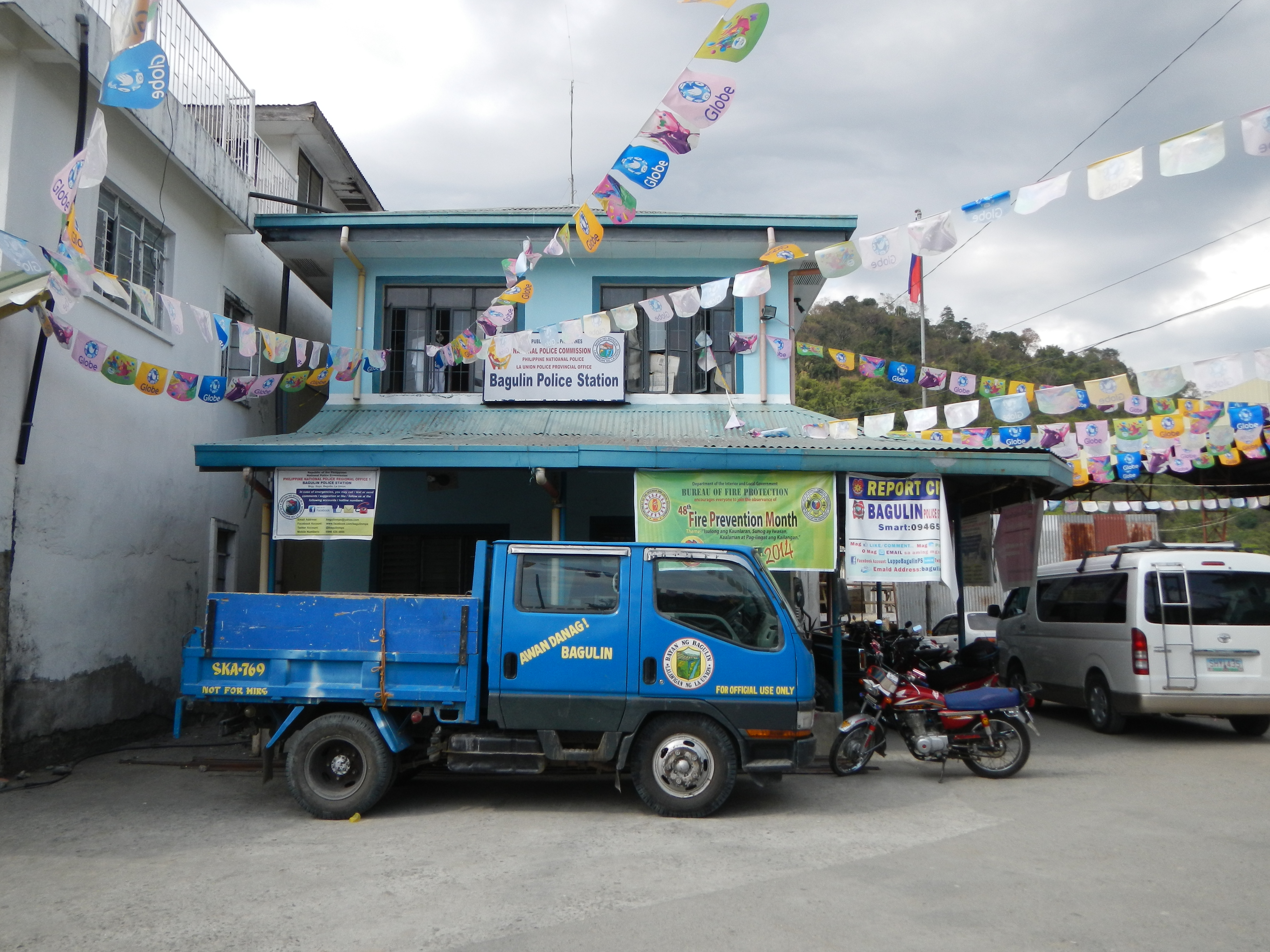
Police station

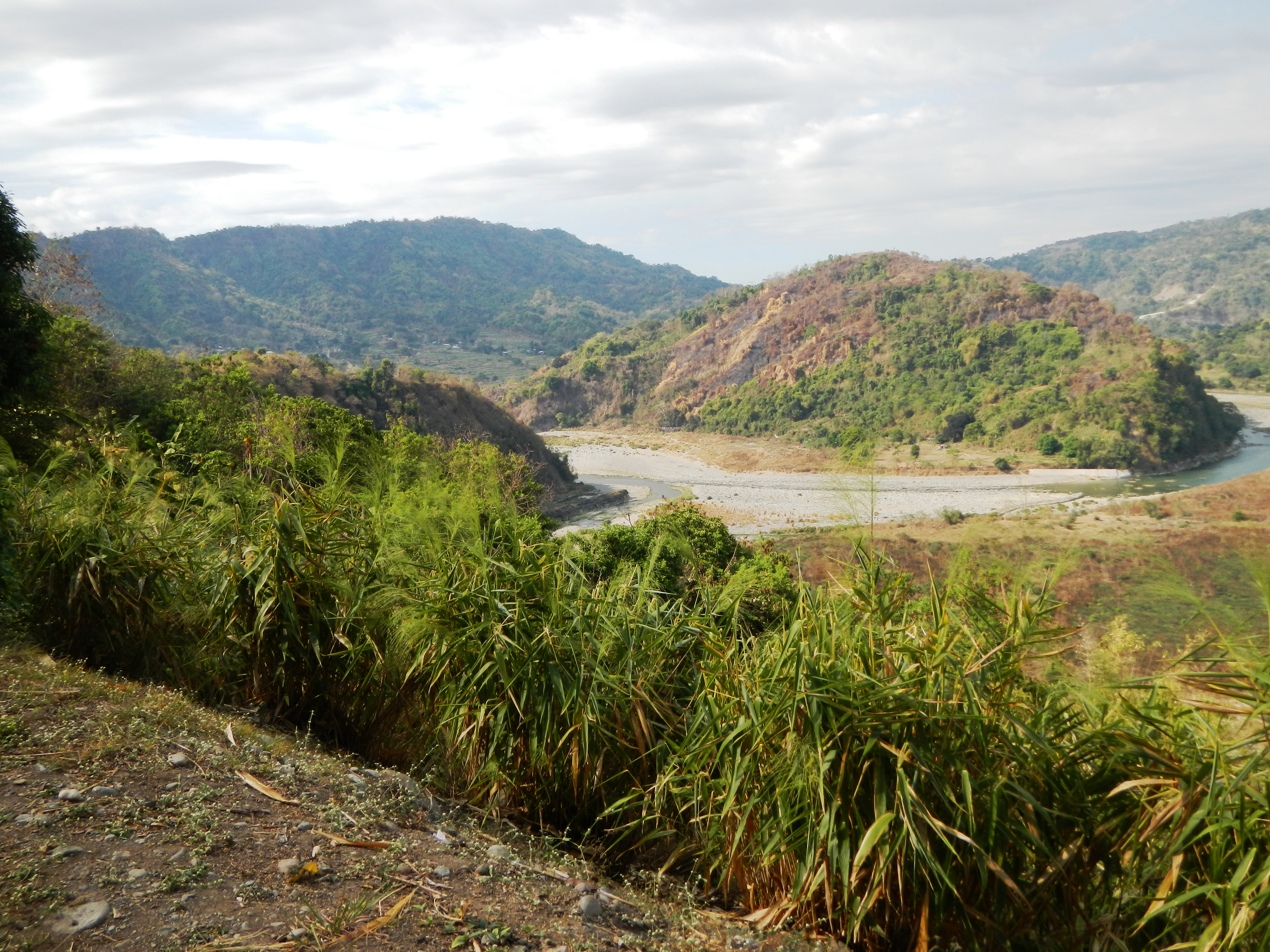
Landscape

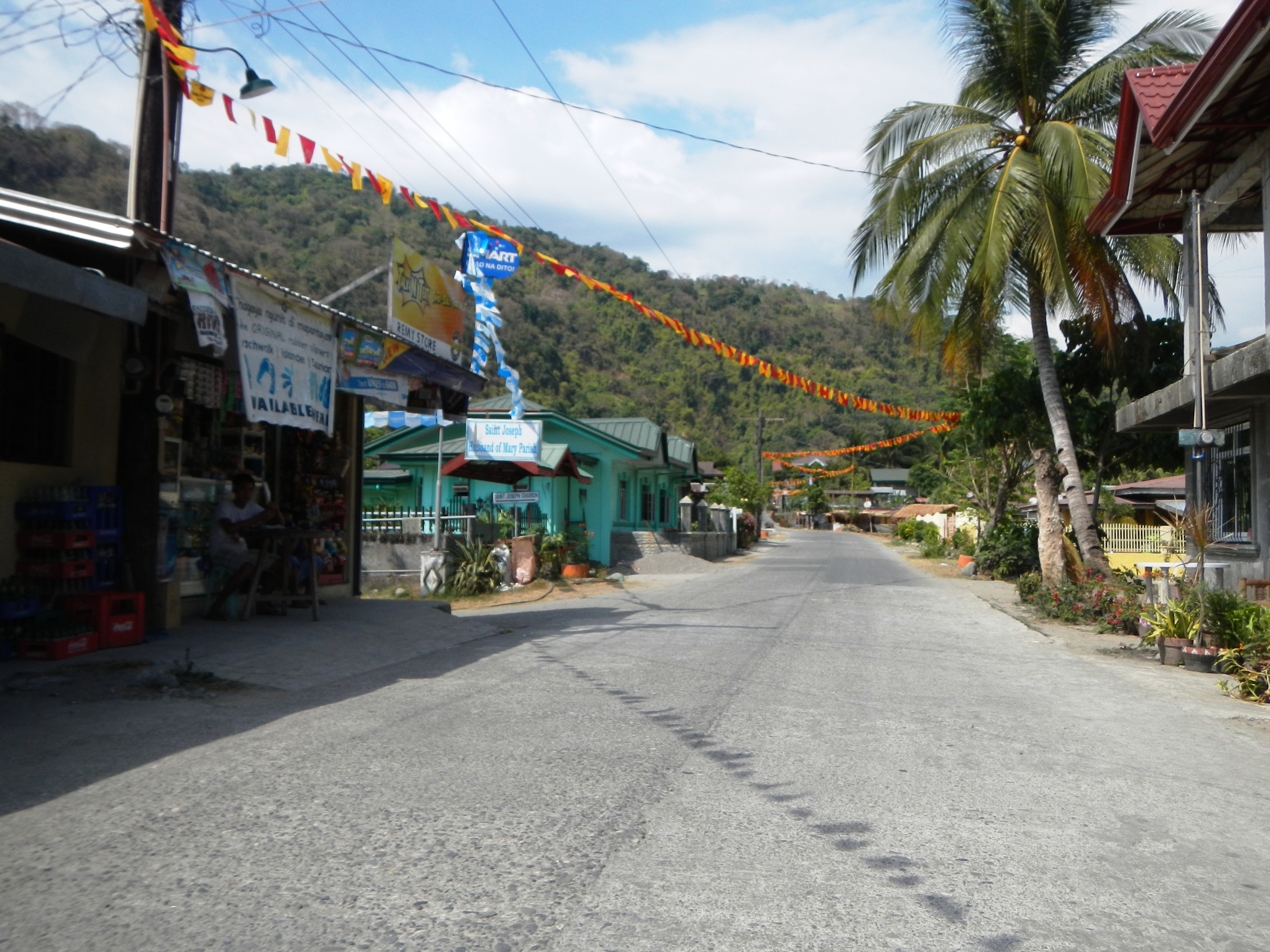
Street view

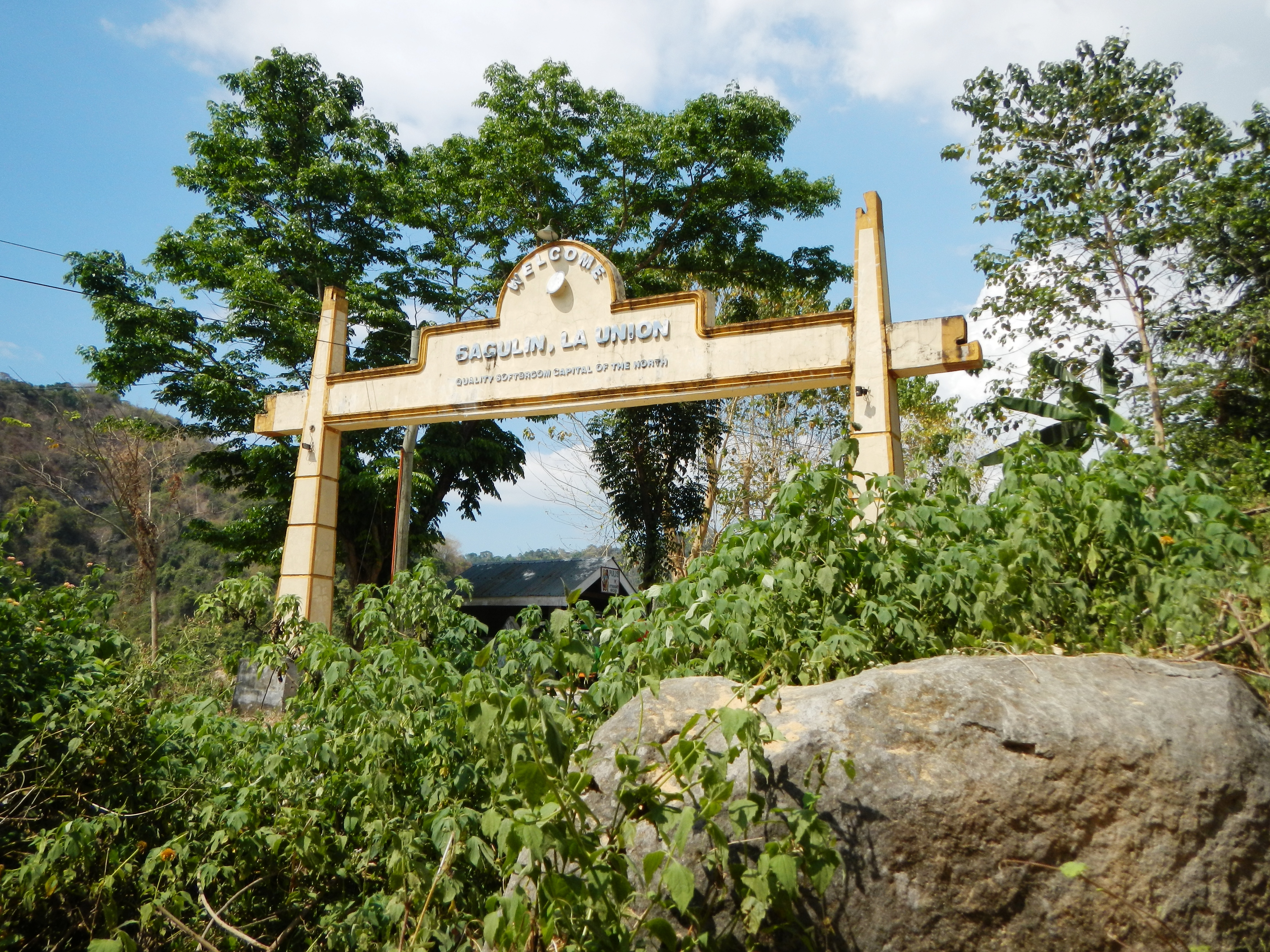
Welcome Arch

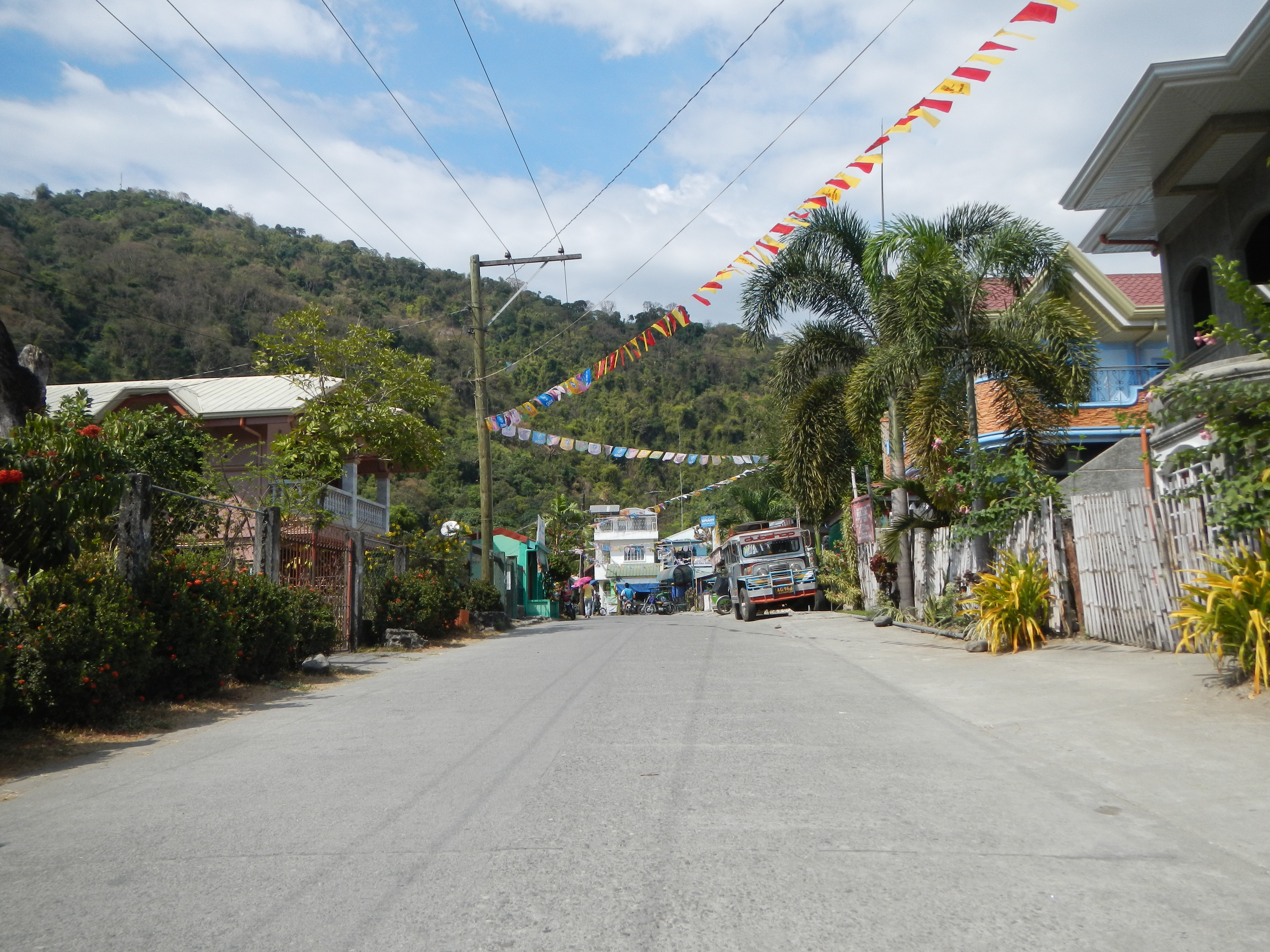
Town Proper

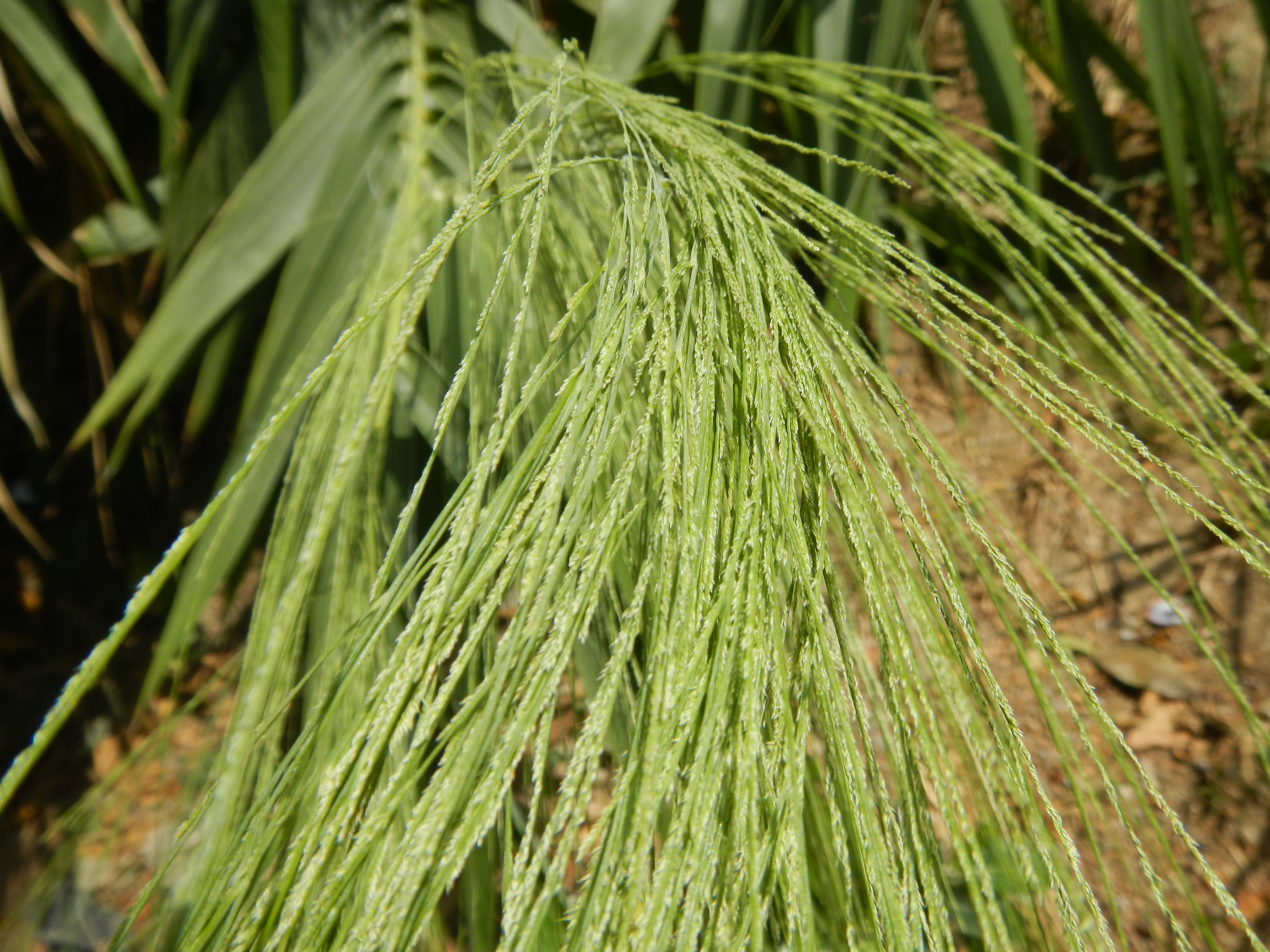
Tiger grass, used for making soft brooms

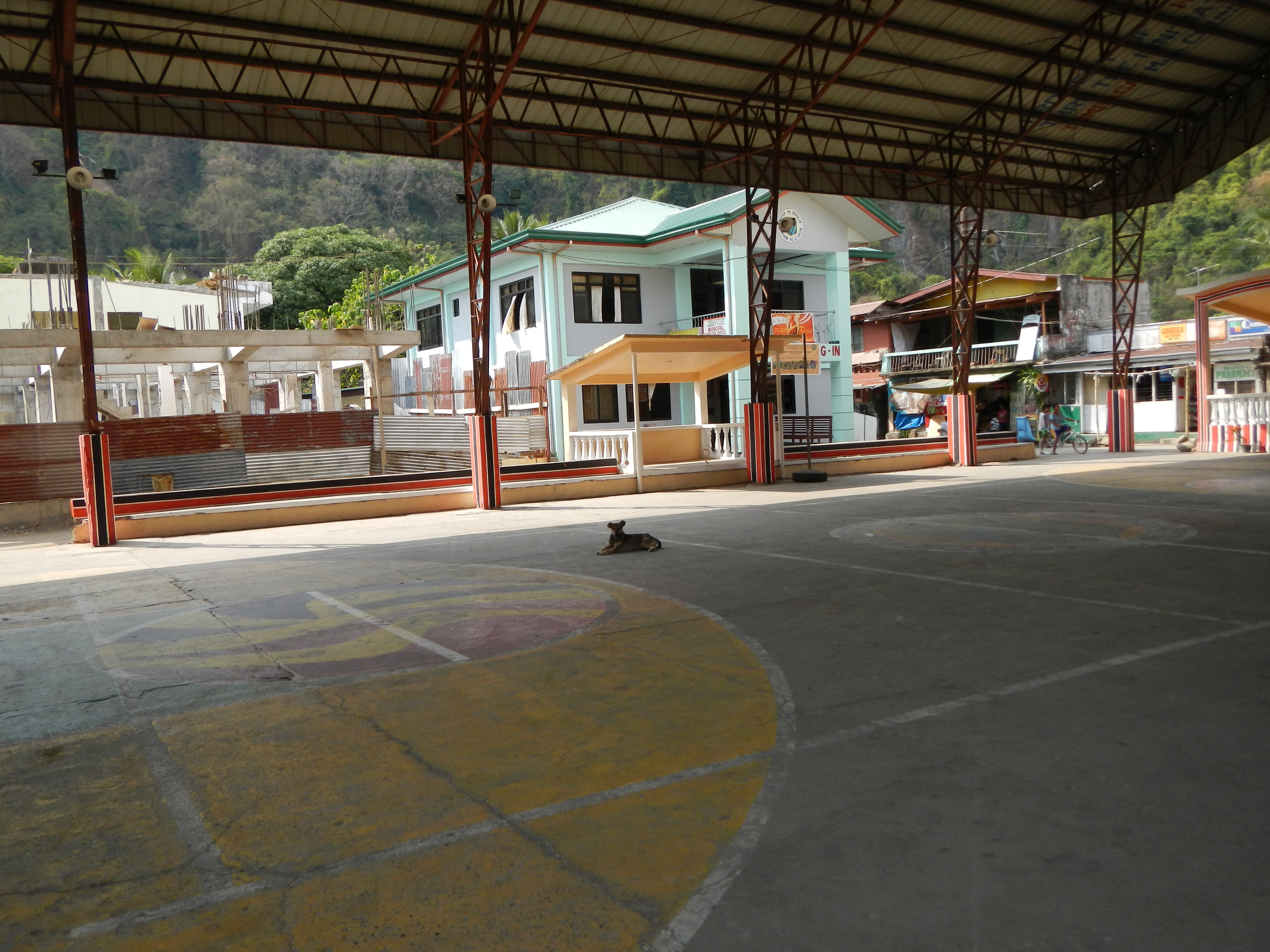
Town Plaza

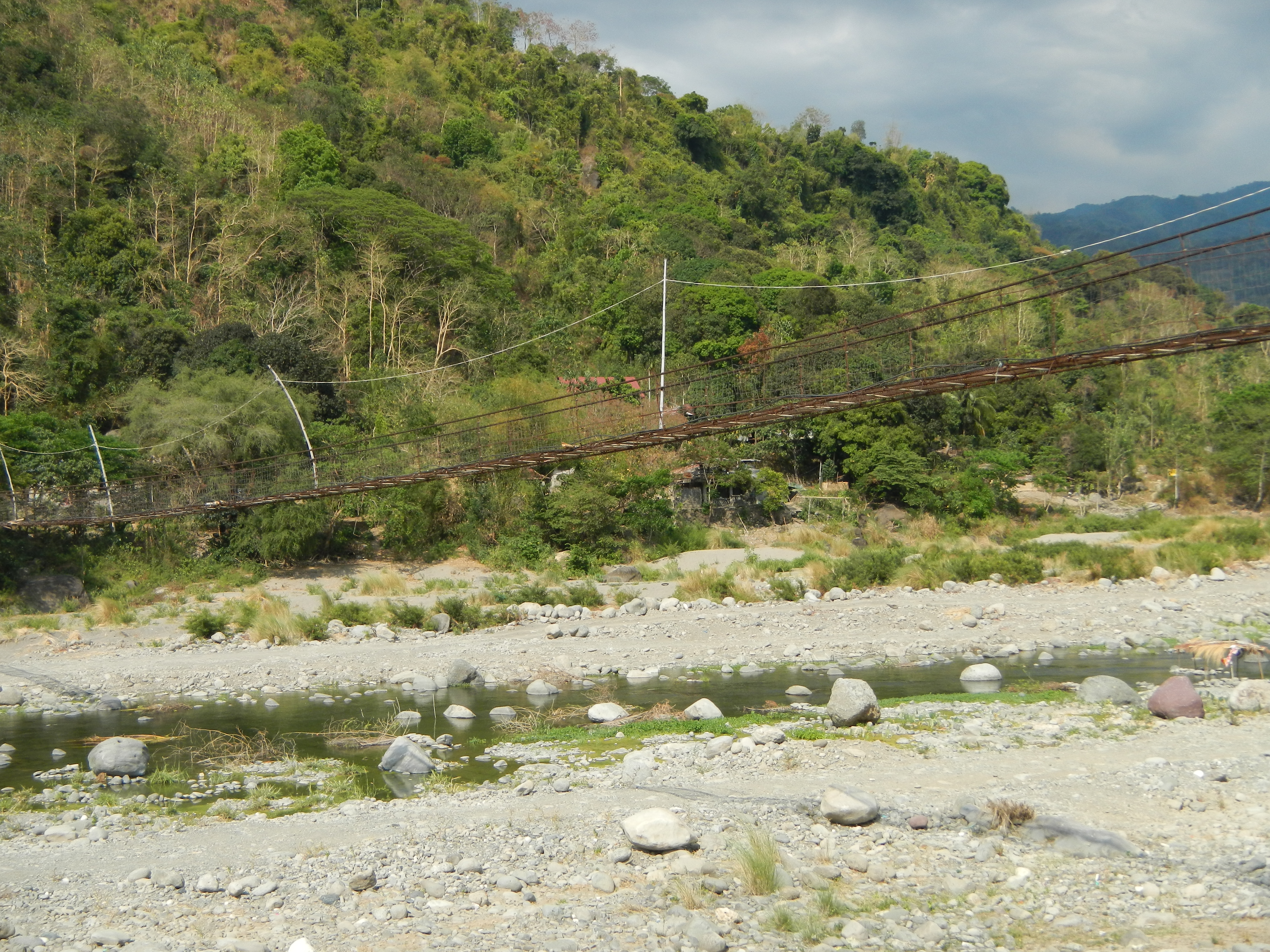
Bagulin River
