= Sablan =

Sablan is a surname. Notable people with the surname include:

== People ==
- Anthony Sablan Apuron (born 1945), former archbishop of the Roman Catholic Archdiocese of Agaña, Guam.
- Fred Sablan, musician from Cupertino, California
- Gregorio Sablan (born 1955), Delegate to the U.S. House of Representatives from the Northern Mariana Islands (2009-2025)
- Jesus Sablan (born 1952), Northern Mariana Islander politician
- Pascale Sablan (born 1983), African-American architect
- Rodil "Boy" Sablan (born 1963/1964), Filipino basketball coach.
- Rudy Sablan (1931–1995), 2nd Lieutenant Governor of Guam
- Tina Sablan (born 1981), Northern Mariana Islander politician
- Vinnie Sablan (born 1978), Northern Mariana Islander politician

== Places ==
- Sablan, Benguet, municipality in the Philippines
