= Balili River =

River in Luzon, Philippines

Balili River Naguilian River
- Balili/Naguilian River mouth Balili River (Philippines)
- Etymology: Barangay Balili, La Trinidad, Benguet

Location
- Country: Philippines
- Region: Cordillera Administrative Region
- Province: Benguet
- City/municipality: Baguio; La Trinidad; Sablan; Bagulin; Naguilian; Bauang

Physical characteristics
- Source: Cordillera Mountains
  - location: Baguio
  - coordinates: 16°25′29″N 120°35′36.9″E
  - elevation: 1,375 m (4,511 ft)
- Mouth: South China Sea
  - location: Bauang, La Union
  - coordinates: 16°31′21″N 120°18′27″E
  - elevation: 196 m (643 ft)
- Length: 62.7 km (39.0 mi)
- Basin size: 508 km^{2} (196 sq mi)
- Discharge
  - location: Bagulin, La Union

Basin features
- Progression: Balili River — Naguilian River
- Tributaries
  - left: Bolo Creek
  - right: Sagudin River; Tuel River

The Balili River, also known as the Naguilian River, is a river in the provinces of Benguet and La Union on the island of Luzon, Philippines. With a total length of 62.7 km (39.0 mi), it traverses the city of Baguio, and the municipalities of La Trinidad and Sablan before entering the province of La Union, where the midstream and downstream is called the Naguilian River. It drains into the South China Sea through the town of Bauang.

== Sources ==
The main tributary of the river is the Sagudin River which flows along barangay Trancoville in the city of Baguio. The Sagudin River itself has 23 tributary creeks coming from the city's populated barangays, which include Santo Niño (also known as the Slaughterhouse Compound), New Lucban, Guisad, Honeymoon, Cabinet Hill, and Pacdal. Other tributaries include the Bolo Creek in La Trinidad.

== Course ==
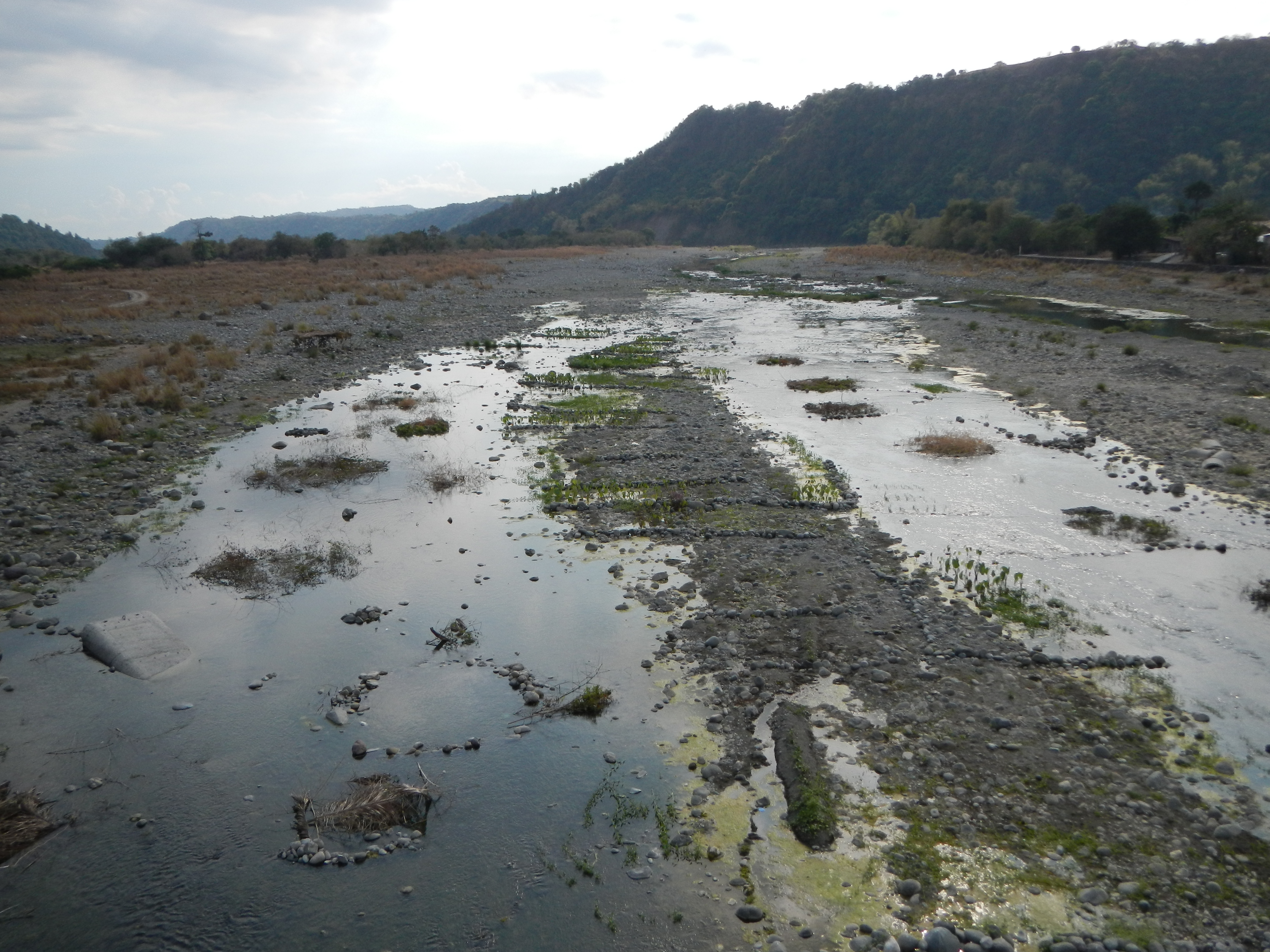
The river in Naguilian, La Union

From Baguio, the Balili River flows northward, entering the municipality of La Trinidad. It traverses the barangays of Lubas, Balili (from which the river is named), Cruz, Poblacion, and Bineng. At upstream Bineng are several mini-hydroelectric power plants operated by Hydroelectric Development Corporation (HEDCOR). Downstream Bineng at the La Trinidad-Sablan-Tublay tri-point, the river is joined by the Tuel River, and continues to flow westward until it reaches the municipality of Sablan. It crosses another HEDCOR-operated mini-hydroelectric power plant, the Ampohaw Hydro, along barangay Banengbeng. As it exits Sablan and enters Bagulin in La Union province, it is named the Naguilian River.

== Pollution ==
The river suffers from excessive pollution, usually blamed upon the densely populated city of Baguio, where its headwaters are formed. A study by the City Environment and Parks Management Office (CEPMO) of Baguio shows that half of the city's population live within the Balili watershed area, contributing the most waste. The Department of Environment and Natural Resources (DENR) revealed that the quality of the Balili River water test result falls under Class C from its water classification of Class A in 1975, which made its waters fit for drinking after treatment. In 2014, the water test result from Balili River is still within the classification of Class C freshwater, but then, the Department of Environment and Natural Resources cannot re-classify a river downgrading its classification from "Class A" to "Class C". The river was included in the DENR's 2003 Pollution Report as one of the 15 "biologically dead" rivers among the 94 principal river basins in the country.

== Rehabilitation efforts ==
Several government agencies, academe and private organizations have expressed concern in rehabilitating the river, forming the Balili River System Revitalization Coalition (BRSRC). The Baguio Sewerage Treatment Plant was constructed in 1986 along Sanitary Camp to filter the river before it enters La Trinidad. In 2013, the river was designated by the DENR as a "Water Quality Management Area" (WQMA) to protect and improve the water quality, pursuant to the Philippine Clean Water Act of 2004.
