= Tiger grass =

Tiger grass is a common name for several plants and may refer to:

== Grasses ==
- Saccharum spontaneum, native to South Asia
- Thysanolaena latifolia (Thysanolaena maxima), native to Asia

== Other flowering plants ==
- Centella asiatica
