= 2025 Philippine House of Representatives elections in the Ilocos Region =

- May 12, 2025
- All 12 Ilocos Region seats in the House of Representatives
Party	Seats	+/–
Lakas	6	+4
NPC	3	−1
Nacionalista	2	−1
PFP	1	New
This lists parties that won seats. See the complete results below.

The 2025 Philippine House of Representatives elections in the Ilocos Region were held on May 12, 2025, to elect twelve members of the House of Representatives from the four provinces of the Ilocos Region. The elections coincided with the national Senate election, other elections to the House, and local races as part of the 2025 midterm elections in the Philippines.

== Summary ==
Political parties belonging to Alyansa para sa Bagong Pilipinas, the electoral alliance formed to support the administration of President Bongbong Marcos, won every district in the Ilocos Region. It is a stronghold for Marcos, who belongs to one of the most prominent Ilocano political families. In the 2022 Philippine presidential election, he won 84.7% of the popular vote, his second-highest total across the regions of the Philippines.

Lakas-CMD, the largest party in the House and the region by the end of the 19th Congress, won the most seats, securing both districts of La Union and four of Pangasinan's six districts. The Nationalist People's Coalition won three, dominating Ilocos Sur, while the Nacionalistas took two. The ruling party, Partido Federal ng Pilipinas, secured one seat in Ilocos Norte.

Congressional district	Incumbent	Incumbent's party	Winner	Winner's party	Winning margin
Ilocos Norte–1st	Sandro Marcos	PFP	Sandro Marcos	PFP	Unopposed
Ilocos Norte–2nd	Eugenio Angelo Barba	Nacionalista	Eugenio Angelo Barba	Nacionalista	Unopposed
Ilocos Sur–1st	Ronald Singson	NPC	Ronald Singson	NPC	84.72%
Ilocos Sur–2nd	Kristine Singson-Meehan	NPC	Kristine Singson-Meehan	NPC	36.36%
La Union–1st	Paolo Ortega	Lakas	Paolo Ortega	Lakas	48.72%
La Union–2nd	Dante Garcia	Lakas	Dante Garcia	Lakas	63.00%
Pangasinan–1st	Arthur Celeste	Nacionalista	Arthur Celeste	Nacionalista	Unopposed
Pangasinan–2nd	Mark Cojuangco	NPC	Mark Cojuangco	NPC	54.28%
Pangasinan–3rd	Maria Rachel Arenas	Lakas	Maria Rachel Arenas	Lakas	84.84%
Pangasinan–4th	Christopher de Venecia	Lakas	Gina de Venecia	Lakas	69.50%
Pangasinan–5th	Ramon Guico Jr.	Lakas	Ramon Guico Jr.	Lakas	30.60%
Pangasinan–6th	Marlyn Primicias-Agabas	Lakas	Marlyn Primicias-Agabas	Lakas	17.92%

== Ilocos Norte ==
=== First district ===
2025 Ilocos Norte's 1st congressional district election
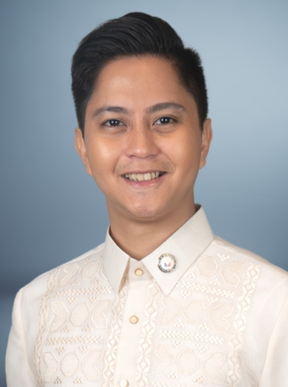
Candidate	Sandro Marcos
Party	PFP
Popular vote	169,880
Percentage	100.0%
House representative before election
Sandro Marcos
PFP
Elected House representative
Sandro Marcos
PFP

The first district encompasses the northern portions of Ilocos Norte, including the capital city of Laoag. Incumbent representative Sandro Marcos, son of President Bongbong Marcos, was first elected in 2022 as a member of the Nacionalista Party. He won 56.6% of the vote.

This election, Marcos, now a member of Partido Federal ng Pilipinas, the party chaired by his father, was unopposed in his bid for a second term. He easily won reelection.

==== Candidates ====
- Sandro Marcos (PFP), incumbent House representative and Senior Deputy Majority Leader

Candidate	Party	Votes	%
Sandro Marcos (incumbent)	Partido Federal ng Pilipinas	169,880	100.00
Total		169,880	100.00
Valid votes		169,880	84.16
Invalid/blank votes		31,979	15.84
Total votes		201,859	100.00
Registered voters/turnout		228,771	88.24
PFP hold			
Source: Commission on Elections

=== Second district ===
2025 Ilocos Norte's 2nd congressional district election
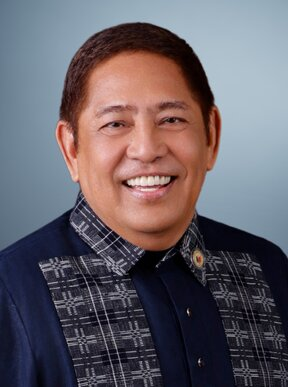
Candidate	Angelo Marcos Barba
Party	Nacionalista
Popular vote	137,658
Percentage	100.0%
House representative before election
Angelo Marcos Barba
Nacionalista
Elected House representative
Angelo Marcos Barba
Nacionalista

The second district covers most of southern Ilocos Norte, including the city of Batac. Angelo Marcos Barba, a member of the dominant Marcos family, is the incumbent representative. Barba won re-election in 2022 with 79.1% of the popular vote.

Facing no opponent, Barba sought and won a third term in the House unopposed. No one outside the Marcos family has won the seat since 1995.

==== Candidates ====
- Angelo Marcos Barba (Nacionalista), incumbent House representative, former vice governor (2010-2019), former member of the Provincial Board (2001-2010), and former mayor of San Nicolas (1992-2001)

Candidate	Party	Votes	%
Angelo Marcos Barba (incumbent)	Nacionalista Party	137,658	100.00
Total		137,658	100.00
Valid votes		137,658	73.97
Invalid/blank votes		48,440	26.03
Total votes		186,098	100.00
Registered voters/turnout		207,316	89.77
Nacionalista hold			
Source: Commission on Elections

== Ilocos Sur ==
=== First district ===
2025 Ilocos Sur's 1st congressional district election
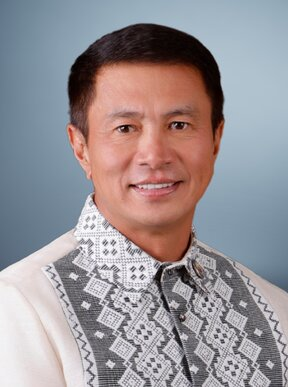
		IND
Candidate	Ronald Singson	DB Savellano
Party	NPC	Independent
Popular vote	143,361	11,854
Percentage	92.4%	7.6%
House representative before election
Ronald Singson
NPC
Elected House representative
Ronald Singson
NPC

The first district covers the northern portions of Ilocos Sur, including the capital city of Vigan. Incumbent Ronald Singson returned to the House in 2022, winning a fourth non-consecutive term with 57.5% of the vote. He is a member of the locally powerful Singson family, who have held the district for 12 of the last 18 years.

Seeking re-election, Singson's sole opponent was Charles Savellano, an unaffiliated farmer. He listed the initials "DB" as his name that would be printed on the ballot - similar initials to those of the late former representative Deogracias Victor Savellano, whom Singson had defeated in the 2022 elections. Following a petition by Singson, Savellano was declared a nuisance candidate by the Commission on Elections' First Division on December 12, 2024.

However, due to a temporary restraining order (TRO) issued by the Supreme Court on January 14, 2025, Savellano was still included in the ballot. Nevertheless, Singson won a second term with 92.4% of the vote, defeating Savellano.

==== Candidates ====
- Charles "DB" Savellano (Independent), farmer
- Ronald Singson (NPC), incumbent and former House representative (2007-2011, 2013-2016)

Candidate	Party	Votes	%
Ronald Singson (incumbent)	Nationalist People's Coalition	143,361	92.36
Charles Savellano	Independent	11,854	7.64
Total		155,215	100.00
Valid votes		155,215	85.52
Invalid/blank votes		26,272	14.48
Total votes		181,487	100.00
Registered voters/turnout		205,761	88.20
NPC hold			
Source: Commission on Elections

=== Second district ===
2025 Ilocos Sur's 2nd congressional district election
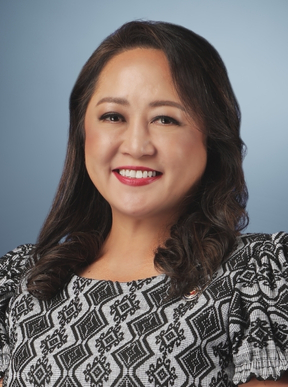
		IND
Candidate	Kristine Singson-Meehan	Roque Verzosa Jr.
Party	NPC	Independent
Popular vote	163,262	76,181
Percentage	68.2%	31.8%
House representative before election
Kristine Singson-Meehan
NPC
Elected House representative
Kristine Singson-Meehan
NPC

The second district comprises the central and southern portions of Ilocos Sur, encompassing the city of Candon. The incumbent representative Kristine Singson-Meehan had won a second term in 2022 unopposed. She is a scion of the Singson family, the dominant political dynasty in the province. Since 1984, a Singson has continuously represented this area in Congress.

Singson-Meehan sought and won re-election to a third term with 68.2% against her only challenger, Roque Verzosa Jr., the term-limited mayor of Tagudin. She swept all but one municipality in the district. Despite winning nearly 32% of the vote, Verzosa only carried his home town.

==== Candidates ====
- Kristine Singson-Meehan (NPC), incumbent House representative and Deputy Speaker
- Roque Verzosa Jr. (Independent), mayor of Tagudin

Candidate	Party	Votes	%
Kristine Singson-Meehan (incumbent)	Nationalist People's Coalition	163,262	68.18
Roque Verzosa Jr.	Independent	76,181	31.82
Total		239,443	100.00
Valid votes		239,443	95.37
Invalid/blank votes		11,625	4.63
Total votes		251,068	100.00
Registered voters/turnout		281,472	89.20
NPC hold			
Source: Commission on Elections

== La Union ==
=== First district ===
2025 La Union's 1st congressional district election
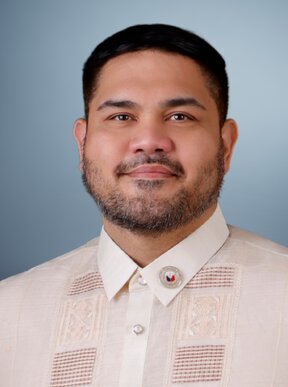
		NP
Candidate	Paolo Ortega	Joy Ortega
Party	Lakas-CMD	Nacionalista
Popular vote	143,823	48,420
Percentage	73.5%	24.7%
House representative before election
Paolo Ortega
Lakas-CMD
Elected House representative
Paolo Ortega
Lakas-CMD

The first district contains the northern half of La Union, including the capital city of San Fernando. Starting in 1969, the Ortega family has represented this area in Congress without interruption. Incumbent representative Paolo Ortega, a member of said family, won election to the House in 2022 under the Nationalist People's Coalition. He took 76.8% of the popular vote.

He sought a second term this election. His main opponent was his first cousin, Joy Ortega, a member of the Provincial Board. Doctor Ed Banzon was the only other candidate in the race. Ortega won reelection in a landslide with a similar vote share of 73.5%, sweeping San Fernando and every municipality in the district.

==== Candidates ====
- Ed Banzon (PDP–Laban), doctor and principal health specialist at the Asian Development Bank
- Joy Ortega (Nacionalista), member of the Provincial Board
- Paolo Ortega (Lakas), incumbent House representative and former member of the Provincial Board (2019-2022)

Candidate	Party	Votes	%
Paolo Ortega (incumbent)	Lakas–CMD	143,823	73.45
Joy Ortega	Nacionalista Party	48,420	24.73
Ed Banzon	PDP–Laban	3,578	1.83
Total		195,821	100.00
Valid votes		195,821	90.08
Invalid/blank votes		21,572	9.92
Total votes		217,393	100.00
Registered voters/turnout		245,584	88.52
Lakas hold			
Source: Commission on Elections

=== Second district ===
2025 La Union's 2nd congressional district election
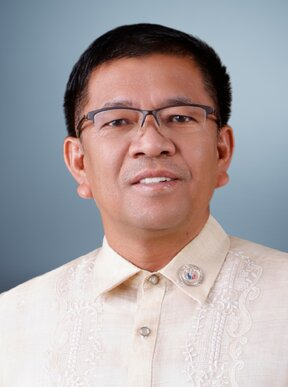

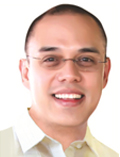
Candidate	Dante Garcia	Pacoy Ortega III
Party	Lakas-CMD	NPC
Popular vote	212,781	47,877
Percentage	81.3%	18.3%
House representative before election
Dante Garcia
Lakas-CMD
Elected House representative
Dante Garcia
Lakas-CMD

The second district contains the southern half of La Union. Incumbent representative Dante Garcia was first elected to the House in 2022 as a member of the People's Reform Party, taking 54.1% of the vote.

Garcia sought and won a second term in a landslide, winning 81.3% against former governor Francisco Ortega III, the father of then-incumbent governor Rafy Ortega-David who had previously represented the Abono Partylist in Congress; and Joel Fontanilla, a local journalist. Garcia won every municipality in the district.

==== Candidates ====
- Joel Fontanilla (Independent), journalist and historian
- Dante Garcia (Lakas), incumbent House representative and former mayor of Tubao (2004-2013, 2016-2019)
- Francisco "Pacoy" Ortega III (NPC), former governor, former House representative for Abono (2007-2016), and former member of the Provincial Board (1998-2001)

Candidate	Party	Votes	%
Dante Garcia (incumbent)	Lakas–CMD	212,781	81.29
Francisco Ortega III	Nationalist People's Coalition	47,877	18.29
Joel Fontanilla	Independent	1,105	0.42
Total		261,763	100.00
Valid votes		261,763	97.06
Invalid/blank votes		7,917	2.94
Total votes		269,680	100.00
Registered voters/turnout		308,690	87.36
Lakas hold			
Source: Commission on Elections

== Pangasinan ==
=== First district ===
2025 Pangasinan's 1st congressional district election
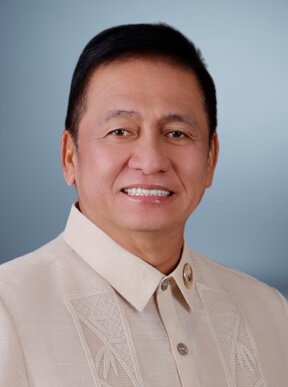
Candidate	Arthur Celeste
Party	Nacionalista
Popular vote	187,173
Percentage	100.0%
House representative before election
Arthur Celeste
Nacionalista
Elected House representative
Arthur Celeste
Nacionalista

The first district comprises the westernmost portions of Pangasinan, centering on the city of Alaminos. The incumbent congressman, Arthur Celeste, a member of the Nacionalista Party, returned to the House in 2022 with 65.2% of the vote. No one outside the Celeste family has represented the district since he was first elected as a representative in 2001.

With Celeste being the sole candidate in the race, he was re-elected to a second term unopposed.

==== Candidates ====
- Arthur "Art" Celeste (Nacionalista), incumbent and former House representative (2001-2010) and former mayor of Alaminos (2013-2019)

Candidate	Party	Votes	%
Arthur Celeste (incumbent)	Nacionalista Party	187,173	100.00
Total		187,173	100.00
Valid votes		187,173	72.72
Invalid/blank votes		70,230	27.28
Total votes		257,403	100.00
Registered voters/turnout		303,690	84.76
Nacionalista hold			
Source: Commission on Elections

=== Second district ===
2025 Pangasinan's 2nd congressional district election
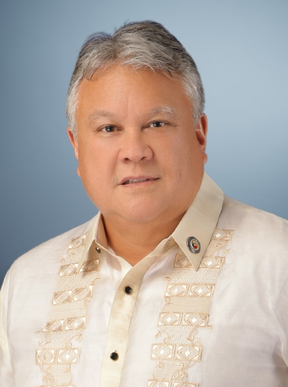
		NUP
Candidate	Mark Cojuangco	Leopoldo Bataoil
Party	NPC	NUP
Popular vote	231,839	68,719
Percentage	77.1%	22.9%
House representative before election
Mark Cojuangco
NPC
Elected House representative
Mark Cojuangco
NPC

The second district contains western and central parts of Pangasinan, including the capital of Lingayen. Incumbent representative Mark Cojuangco is the son of powerful businessman and Marcos crony Danding Cojuangco. As a member of the Nationalist People's Coalition, the party founded by his father, he made a comeback bid for the House in 2022, narrowly winningwith 51.7%.

Mayor Leopoldo Bataoil of Lingayen, himself a former representative of the district, was his only challenger for re-election. Also a former police general and regional director for the PNP, Bataoil decided to forgo reelection to a third and final term to run against Cojuangco.

On election day, Cojuangco won 77.1% of the vote and secured a second term, defeating Bataoil in every municipality within the district. This includes Lingayen, where Cojuangco won over 60% of the vote.

==== Candidates ====
- Leopoldo Bataoil (NUP), mayor of Lingayen and former House representative (2010-2019)
- Mark Cojuangco (NPC), incumbent and former House representative for the 5th district (2001-2010)

Candidate	Party	Votes	%
Mark Cojuangco (incumbent)	Nationalist People's Coalition	231,839	77.14
Leopoldo Bataoil	National Unity Party	68,719	22.86
Total		300,558	100.00
Valid votes		300,558	93.93
Invalid/blank votes		19,416	6.07
Total votes		319,974	100.00
Registered voters/turnout		365,279	87.60
NPC hold			
Source: Commission on Elections

=== Third district ===
2025 Pangasinan's 3rd congressional district election
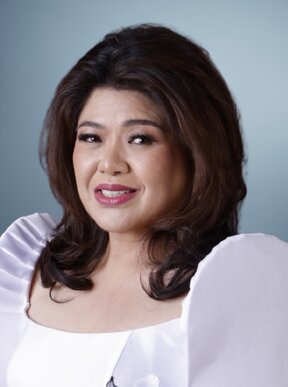
		IND
Candidate	Baby Arenas	Gener Tulagan
Party	Lakas-CMD	Independent
Popular vote	328,672	24,573
Percentage	91.7%	6.9%
House representative before election
Baby Arenas
Lakas-CMD
Elected House representative
Baby Arenas
Lakas-CMD

The third district comprises the centermost parts of the province, including the city of San Carlos. Maria Rachel Arenas, the incumbent congresswoman, won a first term in 2022 as a member of PDP–Laban, taking 90.5% of the vote. She sought a second term in the House.

Arenas faced two opponents in the election: former representative Gener Tulagan and engineer George Absolor, both independent candidates. Tulagan had served as the district's congressman for three terms until 2007, when he was succeeded by Arenas. Since then, she and her mother, Rosemarie Arenas, have been the only people elected to represent this district.

Despite the two candidates running against her, Arenas emerged victorious with 91.7% of the vote, easily defeating both men.

==== Candidates ====
- George Absolor (Independent), engineer
- Maria Rachel "Baby" Arenas (Lakas), incumbent and former House representative (2007-2013) and former chairwoman of the Movie and Television Review and Classification Board (2017-2021)
- Gener Tulagan (Independent), former House representative (1998-2007)

Candidate	Party	Votes	%
Maria Rachel Arenas (incumbent)	Lakas–CMD	328,672	91.69
Gener Tulagan	Independent	24,573	6.85
George Absolor	Independent	5,228	1.46
Total		358,473	100.00
Valid votes		358,473	92.36
Invalid/blank votes		29,670	7.64
Total votes		388,143	100.00
Registered voters/turnout		454,801	85.34
Lakas hold			
Source: Commission on Elections

=== Fourth district ===
2025 Pangasinan's 4th congressional district election
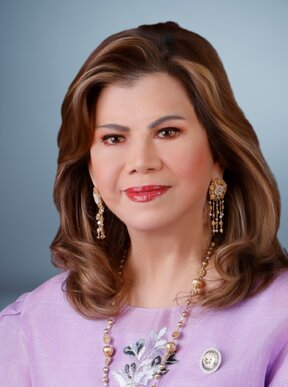
		IND
Candidate	Gina de Venecia	Alvin Fernandez
Party	Lakas-CMD	Independent
Popular vote	229,189	41,239
Percentage	84.8%	15.3%
House representative before election
Gina de Venecia
Lakas-CMD
Elected House representative
Gina de Venecia
Lakas-CMD

The fourth district contains a small, coastal portion of northern Pangasinan, centered around the city of Dagupan. Christopher de Venecia won a third and final term as the district's representative in 2022 with 80.0% of the vote. Thus, he was term-limited and could not seek re-election this year.

As a result, Lakas-CMD, de Venecia's party, nominated his mother Gina de Venecia as their candidate to replace him. She is the wife of Jose de Venecia, the longest-serving House Speaker of the Fifth Republic. With the exception of 1998, a member of the de Venecia family has always been elected from this district. Alvin Fernandez, the former vice mayor of Dagupan, was her only opponent.

With 84.8% of the vote, de Venecia defeated Fernandez in the election, successfully returning to the House. She swept every municipality in the district.

==== Candidates ====
- Gina de Venecia (Lakas), former House representative (2010-2016)
- Alvin Fernandez (Independent), former vice mayor of Dagupan (2001-2007)

Candidate	Party	Votes	%
Gina de Venecia	Lakas–CMD	229,189	84.75
Alvin Fernandez	Independent	41,239	15.25
Total		270,428	100.00
Valid votes		270,428	89.51
Invalid/blank votes		31,686	10.49
Total votes		302,114	100.00
Registered voters/turnout		350,022	86.31
Lakas hold			
Source: Commission on Elections

=== Fifth district ===
2025 Pangasinan's 5th congressional district election
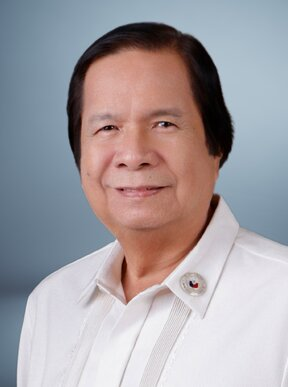
		IND
Candidate	Ramon Guico Jr.	Franco del Prado
Party	Lakas-CMD	Independent
Popular vote	187,934	99,867
Percentage	65.3%	34.7%
House representative before election
Ramon Guico Jr.
Lakas-CMD
Elected House representative
Ramon Guico Jr.
Lakas-CMD

The fifth district comprises a vertical stretch of eastern Pangasinan, with the largest city being Urdaneta. Incumbent representative and three-time mayor of Binalonan Ramon Guico Jr. won his first term in 2022 with 59.4% of the vote, succeeding his son, Mon-Mon, who was elected governor of the province.

Guico ran for and coasted to re-election against councilor Franco del Prado of Urdaneta, winning 65.3% of the vote. While he won most of the municipalities in the district, del Prado won his home city and Bautista.

==== Candidates ====
- Franco del Prado (Independent), councillor and former vice mayor of Urdaneta (2013-2016)
- Ramon Guico Jr. (Lakas), incumbent House representative and mayor of Binalonan (1988-1998, 2001-2010, 2019-2022)

Candidate	Party	Votes	%
Ramon Guico Jr. (incumbent)	Lakas–CMD	187,934	65.30
Franco del Prado	Independent	99,867	34.70
Total		287,801	100.00
Valid votes		287,801	92.18
Invalid/blank votes		24,405	7.82
Total votes		312,206	100.00
Registered voters/turnout		357,155	87.41
Lakas hold			
Source: Commission on Elections

=== Sixth district ===
2025 Pangasinan's 6th congressional district election
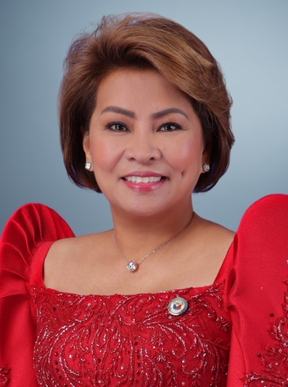
		NPC
Candidate	Marlyn Primicias-Agabas	Gilbert Estrella
Party	Lakas-CMD	NPC
Popular vote	168,185	117,045
Percentage	59.0%	41.0%
House representative before election
Marlyn Primicias-Agabas
Lakas-CMD
Elected House representative
Marlyn Primicias-Agabas
Lakas-CMD

The sixth district is composed of the easternmost municipalities of Pangasinan. Congresswoman Marlyn Primicias-Agabas has, for all but three years between 2019 and 2022, represented this district since 2010. In her most recent re-election bid, she won 92.7% of the vote as a member of PDP–Laban.

Primicias-Agabas' opponent in this election was Gilbert Estrella, son of Secretary of Agrarian Reform Conrado Estrella III, who himself represented the district for 18 of the 27 years he served in Congress.

Candidate	Party	Votes	%
Marlyn Primicias-Agabas (incumbent)	Lakas–CMD	168,185	58.96
Gilbert Estrella	Nationalist People's Coalition	117,045	41.04
Total		285,230	100.00
Valid votes		285,230	98.06
Invalid/blank votes		5,655	1.94
Total votes		290,885	100.00
Registered voters/turnout		325,359	89.40
Lakas hold			
Source: Commission on Elections
