= Results of the 2019 Philippine House of Representatives elections by congressional district =

- May 13, 2019
- All 304 seats to the House of Representatives of the Philippines; 153 seats needed for a majority

The following are the results of the 2019 Philippine House of Representatives elections by congressional district.

== Abra ==
Candidate	Party	Votes	%
Joseph Sto. Niño B. Bernos	PDP–Laban/Asenso Abrenio	115,081	84.27
Victoria Seares-Corpus	Pederalismo ng Dugong Dakilang Samahan	18,251	13.37
Derdrei Roce L. Ifurung	Independent	3,226	2.36
Total		136,558	100.00

== Agusan del Norte ==
=== 1st District ===
Candidate	Party	Votes	%
Lawrence Lemuel H. Fortun	Nacionalista Party	140,701	81.48
Samuel Allan M. Amante	PDP–Laban	31,983	18.52
Total		172,684	100.00

=== 2nd District ===
Candidate	Party	Votes	%
Ma. Angelica Rosedell M. Amante-Matba	PDP–Laban	120,068	63.30
Erlpe John M. Amante	Nacionalista Party	69,623	36.70
Total		189,691	100.00

== Agusan del Sur ==
=== 1st District ===
Candidate	Party	Votes	%
Alfelito M. Bascug	National Unity Party	82,984	64.18
Democrito Antonio G. Plaza III	Partido Demokratiko Sosyalista ng Pilipinas	46,307	35.82
Total		129,291	100.00

=== 2nd District ===
Candidate	Party	Votes	%
Adolph Edward G. Plaza	National Unity Party	111,328	85.90
Herman T. Corro	Independent	9,945	7.67
Maximino T. Robles Jr	Partido Demokratiko Sosyalista ng Pilipinas	8,329	6.43
Total		129,602	100.00

== Aklan ==
=== 1st District ===
Candidate	Party	Votes	%
Carlito Marquez	Nationalist People's Coalition	91,902	65.88
Antonio T. Maming	Independent	43,122	30.91
Axel V. Gonzalez	Independent	4,472	3.21
Total		139,496	100.00

=== 2nd District ===
Candidate	Party	Votes	%
Teodorico Haresco Jr.	National Unity Party	92,846	64.65
Anita Victoria M. Ramos	Nationalist People's Coalition	49,073	34.17
Leovigildo T. Mationg	Partido Federal ng Pilipinas	978	0.68
Juan A. Tumbokon	Independent	708	0.49
Total		143,605	100.00

== Albay ==
=== 1st District ===
Candidate	Party	Votes	%
Edcel C. Lagman Sr	Liberal Party	101,486	54.98
Herbie B. Aguas	Nationalist People's Coalition	81,128	43.95
Hernando B. Bruce	Pederalismo ng Dugong Dakilang Samahan	1,959	1.06
Total		184,573	100.00

=== 2nd District ===
Candidate	Party	Votes	%
Jose Ma. Clemente S. Salceda	PDP–Laban	187,252	94.64
Virgilio A. Goyena	Independent	10,603	5.36
Total		197,855	100.00

=== 3rd District ===
Candidate	Party	Votes	%
Fernando Cabredo	PDP–Laban	107,384	52.18
Reno Lim	Independent	88,745	43.12
Mario P. Marcos	Independent	8,344	4.05
Elmer Felix M. Pornel	Partido Federal ng Pilipinas	1,316	0.64
Total		205,789	100.00

== Antipolo ==
=== 1st District ===
Candidate	Party	Votes	%
Roberto Puno	National Unity Party	107,140	93.01
Macario S. Aggarao	Independent	8,056	6.99
Total		115,196	100.00

=== 2nd District ===
Candidate	Party	Votes	%
Resurreccion Acop	National Unity Party	127,695	100.00
Total		127,695	100.00

== Antique ==
Candidate	Party	Votes	%
Lorna Regina B. Legarda	Nationalist People's Coalition	199,187	72.90
Exequiel Javier	Independent	69,716	25.52
Robin P. Rubinos	Independent	1,951	0.71
Rodelo S. Pidoy	Independent	1,662	0.61
Antero Florante L. Villaflor Jr.	Philippine Green Republican Party	701	0.26
Total		273,217	100.00

== Apayao ==
Candidate	Party	Votes	%
Elias Bulut Jr.	Nationalist People's Coalition	45,630	100.00
Total		45,630	100.00

== Aurora ==
Candidate	Party	Votes	%
Rommel T. Angara	Laban ng Demokratikong Pilipino	63,542	63.39
Narciso C. Amansec	Independent	36,700	36.61
Total		100,242	100.00

== Bacolod ==
Candidate	Party	Votes	%
Greg Gasataya	Nationalist People's Coalition	135,346	60.48
Monico Puentevella	Lakas–CMD	84,705	37.85
Jan Kevin S. Moises	Independent	3,751	1.68
Total		223,802	100.00

== Baguio ==
Candidate	Party	Votes	%
Marquez O. Go	Nacionalista Party	58,603	52.65
Mauricio Domogan	United Nationalist Alliance	30,443	27.35
Nicasio M. Aliping Jr.	Liberal Party	17,134	15.39
Reinaldo A. Bautista Jr.	Lakas–CMD	4,447	3.99
Rama Krishna R. Rosalin-Wasan	Pederalismo ng Dugong Dakilang Samahan	689	0.62
Total		111,316	100.00

== Basilan ==
Candidate	Party	Votes	%
Mujiv Hataman	Liberal Party	121,901	81.08
Omar M. Akbar	Katipunan ng Demokratikong Pilipino	28,450	18.92
Total		150,351	100.00

== Bataan ==
=== 1st District ===
Candidate	Party	Votes	%
Geraldine Roman	PDP–Laban	152,253	91.59
Emelita J. Lubag	Katipunan ng Demokratikong Pilipino	13,983	8.41
Total		166,236	100.00

=== 2nd District ===
Candidate	Party	Votes	%
Jose Enrique S. Garcia III	PDP–Laban	173,701	100.00
Total		173,701	100.00

== Batanes ==
Candidate	Party	Votes	%
Ciriaco Gato Jr.	Nationalist People's Coalition	3,367	35.34
Florencio Abad	Liberal Party	3,129	32.84
Carlo Oliver Diasnes	National Unity Party	3,032	31.82
Total		9,528	100.00

== Batangas ==
=== 1st District ===
Candidate	Party	Votes	%
Ma. Elenita Milagros R. Ermita-Buhain	Nacionalista Party	209,091	81.28
Conrado V. Apacible	PDP–Laban	48,158	18.72
Total		257,249	100.00

=== 2nd District ===
Candidate	Party	Votes	%
Raneo Abu	Nacionalista Party	117,205	88.98
Nicanor M. Conti	PDP–Laban	14,510	11.02
Total		131,715	100.00

=== 3rd District ===
Candidate	Party	Votes	%
Maria Theresa Collantes	PDP–Laban	244,340	74.67
Ma. Chona M. Dimayuga	Independent	63,318	19.35
Jose Gabriel H. Reyes	Independent	11,497	3.51
Nestor L. Burgos	WPP	8,089	2.47
Total		327,244	100.00

=== 4th District ===
Candidate	Party	Votes	%
Lianda Bolilia	Nacionalista Party	124,036	55.49
Mark Llandro Mendoza	Nationalist People's Coalition	99,500	44.51
Total		223,536	100.00

=== 5th District ===
Candidate	Party	Votes	%
Mario Vittorio A. Mariño	Nacionalista Party	132,286	100.00
Total		132,286	100.00

=== 6th District ===
Candidate	Party	Votes	%
Rosa Vilma T. Santos-Recto	Nacionalista Party	96,749	61.01
Meynard Marciano A. Sabili	Independent	61,821	38.99
Total		158,570	100.00

== Benguet ==
Candidate	Party	Votes	%
Nestor Fongwan	PDP–Laban	130,026	76.18
Materno R. Luspian	Lakas–CMD	25,613	15.01
Thorrsson M. Keith	Independent	15,051	8.82
Total		170,690	100.00

== Biliran ==
Candidate	Party	Votes	%
Gerardo Espina Jr.	PDP–Laban	46,772	54.16
Romulo V. Bernardes	Partido Federal ng Pilipinas	38,833	44.96
John A. Jaguros	Pederalismo ng Dugong Dakilang Samahan	760	0.88
Total		86,365	100.00

== Biñan ==
Candidate	Party	Votes	%
Marlyn B. Alonte-Naguiat	PDP–Laban	95,435	83.75
Crispulo P. Antonio	Pederalismo ng Dugong Dakilang Samahan	18,515	16.25
Total		113,950	100.00

== Bohol ==
=== 1st District ===
Candidate	Party	Votes	%
Edgardo M. Chatto	Liberal Party	143,039	69.01
Dan Ismael C. Lim	Nationalist People's Coalition	64,242	30.99
Total		207,281	100.00

=== 2nd District ===
Candidate	Party	Votes	%
Erico Aristotle C. Aumentado	Nationalist People's Coalition	187,719	75.65
Agapito C. Avenido	National Unity Party	60,424	24.35
Total		248,143	100.00

=== 3rd District ===
Candidate	Party	Votes	%
Kristine Alexie T. Besas-Tutor	Nacionalista Party	74,991	33.21
Conchita Toribio-delos Reyes	Partido Federal ng Pilipinas	65,954	29.21
Dionisio D. Balite	Pwersa ng Masang Pilipino	42,877	18.99
Carlos C. Fernando	National Unity Party	41,958	18.58
Total		225,780	100.00

== Bukidnon ==
=== 1st District ===
Candidate	Party	Votes	%
Ma. Lourdes O. Acosta-Alba	Bukidnon Paglaum	119,883	95.44
Andres A. Eligan Jr.	PDP–Laban	5,723	4.56
Total		125,606	100.00

=== 2nd District ===
Candidate	Party	Votes	%
Jonathan Keith Flores	PDP–Laban	90,944	53.52
Ignacio W. Zubiri	Bukidnon Paglaum	78,977	46.48
Total		169,921	100.00

=== 3rd District ===
Candidate	Party	Votes	%
Manuel Antonio F. Zubiri	Bukidnon Paglaum	136,768	100.00
Total		136,768	100.00

=== 4th District ===
Candidate	Party	Votes	%
Rogelio Neil Roque	Nacionalista Party	95,142	76.95
Rhea Rhenna H. Agripo	PDP–Laban	27,125	21.94
Eddie C. Dangcal II	Partido Federal ng Pilipinas	1,367	1.11
Total		123,634	100.00

== Bulacan ==
=== 1st District ===
Candidate	Party	Votes	%
Jose Antonio Sy-Alvarado	National Unity Party	205,400	74.56
Alexander K. Tantoco	PDP–Laban	59,582	21.63
Ronald Lawrence V. Tantoco	Lakas–CMD	10,504	3.81
Total		275,486	100.00

=== 2nd District ===
Candidate	Party	Votes	%
Gavini C. Pancho	National Unity Party	287,118	93.16
Jaime E. Villafuerte	Independent	11,900	3.86
Rafael G. Avila	Independent	9,178	2.98
Total		308,196	100.00

=== 3rd District ===
Candidate	Party	Votes	%
Lorna F. Cillian-Silverio	National Unity Party	135,830	51.58
Joselito Andrew R. Mendoza	PDP–Laban	103,505	39.30
Ricardo S. Silverio Jr.	Pwersa ng Masang Pilipino	22,630	8.59
Arnaldo A. Villena	Independent	1,374	0.52
Total		263,339	100.00

=== 4th District ===
Candidate	Party	Votes	%
Henry Villarica	PDP–Laban	191,992	100.00
Total		191,992	100.00

== Cagayan ==
=== 1st District ===
Candidate	Party	Votes	%
Ramon C. Nolasco Jr.	PDP–Laban	126,538	100.00
Total		126,538	100.00

=== 2nd District ===
Candidate	Party	Votes	%
Samantha Louise V. Alfonso	National Unity Party	88,960	66.88
Darwin B. Sacramed	PDP–Laban	34,677	26.07
Melvin P. Vargas Sr.	Independent	9,375	7.05
Total		133,012	100.00

=== 3rd District ===
Candidate	Party	Votes	%
Joseph Lara	PDP–Laban	118,674	61.51
Nancy P. Ting	National Unity Party	74,248	38.49
Total		192,922	100.00

== Cagayan de Oro ==
=== 1st District ===
Candidate	Party	Votes	%
Rolando Uy	PDP–Laban	85,391	78.00
Caesar Ian E. Acenas	Padayon Pilipino	24,091	22.00
Total		109,482	100.00

=== 2nd District ===
Candidate	Party	Votes	%
Rufus Rodriguez	Centrist Democratic Party of the Philippines	82,692	62.19
Yan Lam S. Lim	PDP–Laban	48,861	36.74
Rogelio T. Villazorda Jr	Independent	1,422	1.07
Total		132,975	100.00

== Calamba ==
Candidate	Party	Votes	%
Joaquin M. Chipeco Jr.	Nacionalista Party	149,428	100.00
Total		149,428	100.00

== Caloocan ==
=== 1st District ===
Candidate	Party	Votes	%
Dale Gonzalo R. Malapitan	PDP–Laban	284,851	100.00
Total		284,851	100.00

=== 2nd District ===
Candidate	Party	Votes	%
Edgar R. Erice	Liberal Party	124,223	90.30
Noel M. Cabuhat	National Unity Party	13,349	9.70
Total		137,572	100.00

== Camarines Norte ==
=== 1st District ===
Candidate	Party	Votes	%
Josefina Tallado	PDP–Laban	65,924	51.90
Renato J. Unico Jr.	National Unity Party	57,439	45.22
Philip Emmanuel C. Peñaflor	Independent	3,655	2.88
Total		127,018	100.00

=== 2nd District ===
Candidate	Party	Votes	%
Marisol Panotes	PDP–Laban	86,075	66.41
Liwayway Vinzons-Chato	Kusog Bikolandia	41,862	32.30
Donald E. Asis	Independent	1,677	1.29
Total		129,614	100.00

== Camarines Sur ==
=== 1st District ===
Candidate	Party	Votes	%
Marissa Lourdes L. Mercado-Andaya	Nationalist People's Coalition	61,480	67.78
Roberto F. Mejia	Nacionalista Party	29,228	32.22
Total		90,708	100.00

=== 2nd District ===
Candidate	Party	Votes	%
Luis Raymund Villafuerte	Nacionalista Party	80,029	51.09
Ma. Belen G. Andaya-Eusebio	Nationalist People's Coalition	76,615	48.91
Total		156,644	100.00

=== 3rd District ===
Candidate	Party	Votes	%
Gabriel H. Bordado Jr.	Liberal Party	102,929	47.72
Luis R. Villafuerte Sr.	Nacionalista Party	81,304	37.70
Sulpicio S. Roco Jr.	PDP–Laban	31,446	14.58
Total		215,679	100.00

=== 4th District ===
Candidate	Party	Votes	%
Arnulf Bryan Fuentebella	Nationalist People's Coalition	120,464	56.08
Ernesto Raoul V. Magtuto Jr	Nacionalista Party	94,334	43.92
Total		214,798	100.00

=== 5th District ===
Candidate	Party	Votes	%
Jocelyn F. Fortuno	Nacionalista Party	115,355	57.57
Remelisa G. Alfelor-Moraleda	Nationalist People's Coalition	83,392	41.62
Jesus R. Aure	Independent	1,634	0.82
Total		200,381	100.00

== Camiguin ==
Candidate	Party	Votes	%
Xavier Jesus Romualdo	PDP–Laban	41,306	88.59
Luisito Ucab	Pederalismo ng Dugong Dakilang Samahan	4,861	10.43
Bienvenido N. Bete	Independent	458	0.98
Total		46,625	100.00

== Capiz ==
=== 1st District ===
Candidate	Party	Votes	%
Emmanuel A. Billones Sr	Liberal Party	87,905	54.58
Blesilda P. Almalbis	United Nationalist Alliance	62,374	38.72
Ruth D. So-Chan	Partido Federal ng Pilipinas	6,929	4.30
Marcelo I. Barruela Jr	Pederalismo ng Dugong Dakilang Samahan	3,862	2.40
Total		161,070	100.00

=== 2nd District ===
Candidate	Party	Votes	%
Fredenil H. Castro	National Unity Party	136,929	95.86
Ma. Vilma V. Besana	Pederalismo ng Dugong Dakilang Samahan	5,907	4.14
Total		142,836	100.00

== Catanduanes ==
Candidate	Party	Votes	%
Hector S. Sanchez	Independent	56,743	38.40
Araceli B. Wong	Nacionalista Party	44,407	30.06
Jorge V. Sarmiento	National Unity Party	40,970	27.73
Joseph A. Santiago	Nationalist People's Coalition	5,630	3.81
Total		147,750	100.00

== Cavite ==
=== 1st District ===
Candidate	Party	Votes	%
Francis Gerald Abaya	Liberal Party	117,031	89.28
Jose Luis R. Granados	Pwersa ng Masang Pilipino	14,053	10.72
Total		131,084	100.00

=== 2nd District ===
Candidate	Party	Votes	%
Edwin "Strike" M. Revilla	National Unity Party	141,465	100.00
Total		141,465	100.00

=== 3rd District ===
Candidate	Party	Votes	%
Alex L. Advincula	PDP–Laban	118,716	100.00
Total		118,716	100.00

=== 4th District ===
Candidate	Party	Votes	%
Elpidio Barzaga Jr.	National Unity Party	198,591	77.26
Benjardi H. Mantele	Partido Federal ng Pilipinas	51,384	19.99
Aileen N. Padel	Pederalismo ng Dugong Dakilang Samahan	3,839	1.49
Leonardo N. Manicio Jr.	PDP–Laban	3,225	1.25
Total		257,039	100.00

=== 5th District ===
Candidate	Party	Votes	%
Dahlia A. Loyola	Nationalist People's Coalition	161,772	94.89
Jose A. Carpio	PDP–Laban	8,716	5.11
Total		170,488	100.00

=== 6th District ===
Candidate	Party	Votes	%
Luis Ferrer IV	National Unity Party	84,282	100.00
Total		84,282	100.00

=== 7th District ===
Candidate	Party	Votes	%
Jesus Crispin Remulla	Nacionalista Party	128,674	67.83
Hermogenes C. Arayata III	Aksyon Demokratiko	61,031	32.17
Total		189,705	100.00

=== 8th District ===
Candidate	Party	Votes	%
Abraham Tolentino	PDP–Laban	143,367	100.00
Total		143,367	100.00

== Cebu ==
=== 1st District ===
Candidate	Party	Votes	%
Eduardo Gullas	Nacionalista Party/Alayon	236,944	81.32
Ron R. del Mar	Democratic Party of the Philippines	48,131	16.52
Solomon S. Paypa	Independent	6,291	2.16
Total		291,366	100.00

=== 2nd District ===
Candidate	Party	Votes	%
Wilfredo Caminero	National Unity Party	66,166	56.45
Ronald Allan G. Cesante	PDP–Laban/One Cebu	48,918	41.74
Cora-Lou B. Kintanar	United Nationalist Alliance	2,125	1.81
Total		117,209	100.00

=== 3rd District ===
Candidate	Party	Votes	%
Pablo John Garcia	PDP–Laban/One Cebu	128,878	51.68
John Henry Osmeña	Independent	77,068	30.91
Geraldine P. Yapha	Nationalist People's Coalition	43,416	17.41
Total		249,362	100.00

=== 4th District ===
Candidate	Party	Votes	%
Janice Z. Salimbangon	PDP–Laban/One Cebu	136,582	56.89
Celestino E. Martinez Jr	Nationalist People's Coalition	103,493	43.11
Total		240,075	100.00

=== 5th District ===
Candidate	Party	Votes	%
Vincent Franco D. Frasco	Lakas–CMD/One Cebu	152,435	56.61
Ramon Durano VI	Nationalist People's Coalition/BAKUD	116,826	43.39
Total		269,261	100.00

=== 6th District ===
Candidate	Party	Votes	%
Emmarie M. Ouano-Dizon	PDP–Laban/One Cebu	177,791	78.93
Baldomero C. Estenzo	Nationalist People's Coalition	41,477	18.41
Walter O. Dy	Independent	5,974	2.65
Total		225,242	100.00

=== 7th District ===
Candidate	Party	Votes	%
Peter John Calderon	Nationalist People's Coalition	71,123	66.30
Nelson Gamaliel F. Garcia	PDP–Laban/One Cebu	36,147	33.70
Total		107,270	100.00

== Cebu City ==
=== 1st District ===
Candidate	Party	Votes	%
Raul del Mar	Liberal Party	105,581	55.28
Richard Edison U. Yap	PDP–Laban/Partido Barug	81,575	42.71
Florencio O. Villamin	Independent	2,244	1.17
Ricardo S. Dungog	Independent	1,609	0.84
Total		191,009	100.00

=== 2nd District ===
Candidate	Party	Votes	%
Rodrigo A. Abellanosa Sr	Laban ng Demokratikong Pilipino	163,752	61.22
Jocelyn G. Pesquera	PDP–Laban/Partido Barug	103,717	38.78
Total		267,469	100.00

== Cotabato ==
=== 1st District ===
Candidate	Party	Votes	%
Joselito S. Sacdalan	PDP–Laban	88,857	46.52
Loreto V. Cabaya Jr.	Nacionalista Party	68,543	35.89
Dulia T. Dandalanin-Sultan	Kilusang Bagong Lipunan	33,594	17.59
Total		190,994	100.00

=== 2nd District ===
Candidate	Party	Votes	%
Rudy Caoagdan	Nacionalista Party	71,205	40.35
Efren F. Piñol	PDP–Laban	48,579	27.53
Gregorio T. Ipong	Independent	43,332	24.55
Lee Michael A. Rualo	Partido Federal ng Pilipinas	13,371	7.58
Total		176,487	100.00

=== 3rd District ===
Candidate	Party	Votes	%
Jose Tejada	Nacionalista Party	136,212	100.00
Total		136,212	100.00

== Davao City ==
=== 1st District ===
Candidate	Party	Votes	%
Paolo Duterte	Hugpong sa Tawong Lungsod	197,370	96.45
Susana S. Uyanguren	Independent	5,135	2.51
Rex M. Labis	Independent	2,124	1.04
Total		204,629	100.00

=== 2nd District ===
Candidate	Party	Votes	%
Vincent Garcia	Hugpong ng Pagbabago	174,389	100.00
Total		174,389	100.00

=== 3rd District ===
Candidate	Party	Votes	%
Isidro Ungab	Hugpong ng Pagbabago	160,732	100.00
Total		160,732	100.00

== Davao de Oro ==
=== 1st District ===
Candidate	Party	Votes	%
Manuel E. Zamora	Hugpong ng Pagbabago	78,257	52.50
Francisco J. Tito	Independent	70,808	47.50
Total		149,065	100.00

=== 2nd District ===
Candidate	Party	Votes	%
Ruwel Peter Gonzaga	PDP–Laban	143,596	100.00
Total		143,596	100.00

== Davao del Norte ==
=== 1st District ===
Candidate	Party	Votes	%
Pantaleon Alvarez	PDP–Laban	164,270	70.46
Antonio Rafael G. del Rosario	Hugpong ng Pagbabago	68,470	29.37
Ronelo M. Rafales	Independent	407	0.17
Total		233,147	100.00

=== 2nd District ===
Candidate	Party	Votes	%
Alan Dujali	PDP–Laban	125,942	56.92
Antonio R. Floirendo Jr	Hugpong ng Pagbabago	93,035	42.05
Rico L. Peligro	Independent	2,293	1.04
Total		221,270	100.00

== Davao del Sur ==
Candidate	Party	Votes	%
Mercedes C. Cagas	Nacionalista Party	178,491	66.95
Juanito O. Morales	Hugpong ng Pagbabago	80,961	30.37
Ronald L. Banac	Independent	4,367	1.64
Brando L. Agbon	Independent	2,788	1.05
Total		266,607	100.00

== Davao Occidental ==
Candidate	Party	Votes	%
Lorna Bautista-Bandigan	Nationalist People's Coalition	75,765	100.00
Total		75,765	100.00

== Davao Oriental ==
=== 1st District ===
Candidate	Party	Votes	%
Corazon T. Nuñez-Malanyaon	Nacionalista Party	71,612	100.00
Total		71,612	100.00

=== 2nd District ===
Candidate	Party	Votes	%
Joel Mayo Z. Almario	PDP–Laban	121,748	100.00
Total		121,748	100.00

== Dinagat Islands ==
Candidate	Party	Votes	%
Alan Uno Ecleo	PDP–Laban	26,746	50.46
Annabel P. Pelismino	Liberal Party	26,258	49.54
Total		53,004	100.00

== Eastern Samar ==
Candidate	Party	Votes	%
Maria Fe Abunda	PDP–Laban	95,208	41.01
Christopher Sheen P. Gonzales	Nacionalista Party	88,008	37.91
Conrado U. Nicart III	Nationalist People's Coalition	46,164	19.88
Julio Gonzales	Partido Federal ng Pilipinas	1,875	0.81
Febida L. Padel	Democratic Party of the Philippines	921	0.40
Total		232,176	100.00

== Guimaras ==
Candidate	Party	Votes	%
Ma. Lucille L. Nava	PDP–Laban	75,295	87.07
Henry G. Babiera	Independent	8,760	10.13
Davis W. Columna	Partido Federal ng Pilipinas	2,425	2.80
Total		86,480	100.00

== Ifugao ==
Candidate	Party	Votes	%
Solomon Chungalao	Nationalist People's Coalition	27,324	28.47
Eugene M. Balitang	Laban ng Demokratikong Pilipino	25,362	26.43
Pedro G. Mayam-o	Independent	19,638	20.46
Jonathan M. Cuyahon	Lakas–CMD	18,418	19.19
Siegfreid A. Mondiguing	PDP–Laban	5,231	5.45
Total		95,973	100.00

== Iligan ==
Candidate	Party	Votes	%
Frederick W. Siao	Nacionalista Party	64,354	50.85
Leony Roy G. Ga	PDP–Laban	61,480	48.58
James B. Aldeguer	Partido Federal ng Pilipinas	727	0.57
Total		126,561	100.00

== Ilocos Norte ==
=== 1st District ===
Candidate	Party	Votes	%
Ria Christina Fariñas	PDP–Laban	106,780	69.89
Reynaldo Francisco R. Remigio Jr.	Nacionalista Party	46,012	30.11
Total		152,792	100.00

=== 2nd District ===
Candidate	Party	Votes	%
Eugenio Angelo M. Barba	Nacionalista Party	87,725	56.45
Hilario P. Valdez	Aksyon Demokratiko	58,020	37.34
Marynette R. Gamboa	Pederalismo ng Dugong Dakilang Samahan	9,646	6.21
Total		155,391	100.00

== Ilocos Sur ==
=== 1st District ===
Candidate	Party	Votes	%
Deogracias Victor Savellano	Nacionalista Party	76,165	50.66
Ronald Singson	Independent	73,012	48.56
Benito C. Aguilar	Independent	1,165	0.77
Total		150,342	100.00

=== 2nd District ===
Candidate	Party	Votes	%
Grace Kristine G. Singson-Meehan	Bileg Ti Ilokano	158,523	89.35
Arturo G. Chua Sr.	PDP–Laban	18,898	10.65
Total		177,421	100.00

== Iloilo ==
=== 1st District ===
Candidate	Party	Votes	%
Janette Garin	Nacionalista Party	121,503	81.46
Gerardo N. Flores	Independent	27,658	18.54
Total		149,161	100.00

=== 2nd District ===
Candidate	Party	Votes	%
Michael Gorriceta	Nacionalista Party	106,121	71.50
Dennis S. Superficial	National Unity Party	41,072	27.67
Mark John C. Velasco	Independent	1,226	0.83
Total		148,419	100.00

=== 3rd District ===
Candidate	Party	Votes	%
Lorenz Defensor	PDP–Laban	153,395	86.00
Emmanuel R. Gallar	Nacionalista Party	24,961	14.00
Total		178,356	100.00

=== 4th District ===
Candidate	Party	Votes	%
Braeden John Q. Biron	Nacionalista Party	128,935	77.15
Marven B. Daquilanea	PDP–Laban	36,347	21.75
Erlina B. Barte	Pederalismo ng Dugong Dakilang Samahan	1,848	1.11
Total		167,130	100.00

=== 5th District ===
Candidate	Party	Votes	%
Raul Tupas	Nacionalista Party	139,100	65.12
Niel C. Tupas Jr.	Liberal Party	73,783	34.54
Gervacio C. del Castillo	Independent	714	0.33
Total		213,597	100.00

== Iloilo City ==
Candidate	Party	Votes	%
Julienne Baronda	National Unity Party	115,148	56.06
Joshua C. Alim	Pwersa ng Masang Pilipino	74,012	36.03
Perla S. Zulueta	Nacionalista Party	15,003	7.30
Lucio T. Encio	Pederalismo ng Dugong Dakilang Samahan	1,238	0.60
Total		205,401	100.00

== Isabela ==
=== 1st District ===
Candidate	Party	Votes	%
Antonio T. Albano	PDP–Laban	153,514	94.44
Alfonso B. Singson	Nationalist People's Coalition	8,219	5.06
Stephen G. Soliven	Independent	821	0.51
Total		162,554	100.00

=== 2nd District ===
Candidate	Party	Votes	%
Ed Christopher Go	Nacionalista Party	58,685	79.83
Luisito O. Cumigad	PDP–Laban	14,825	20.17
Total		73,510	100.00

=== 3rd District ===
Candidate	Party	Votes	%
Ian Paul Dy	Nationalist People's Coalition	78,477	69.43
Robert G. Siquian	PDP–Laban	28,471	25.19
Darwin E. Abuan	Independent	4,512	3.99
Mailyn A. Siquian	Independent	1,570	1.39
Total		113,030	100.00

=== 4th District ===
Candidate	Party	Votes	%
Alyssa Sheena P. Tan-Dy	Partido Federal ng Pilipinas	74,225	56.23
Giorgidi Aggabao	Nationalist People's Coalition	55,815	42.28
Heherson Alvarez	PDP–Laban	1,464	1.11
Jeanybel A. Coquilla	Pederalismo ng Dugong Dakilang Samahan	500	0.38
Total		132,004	100.00

=== 5th District ===
Candidate	Party	Votes	%
Faustino Michael Carlos T. Dy III	Partido Federal ng Pilipinas	80,031	67.24
Edwin C. Uy	PDP–Laban	38,984	32.76
Total		119,015	100.00

=== 6th District ===
Candidate	Party	Votes	%
Faustino A. Dy V	PDP–Laban	105,324	91.44
Abraham T. Lim	Lakas–CMD	9,860	8.56
Total		115,184	100.00

== Kalinga ==
Candidate	Party	Votes	%
Allan Jesse C. Mangaoang	Nacionalista Party	58,753	52.83
Jocel C. Baac	PDP–Laban	52,452	47.17
Total		111,205	100.00

== La Union ==
=== 1st District ===
Candidate	Party	Votes	%
Pablo C. Ortega	Nationalist People's Coalition	145,723	100.00
Total		145,723	100.00

=== 2nd District ===
Candidate	Party	Votes	%
Sandra Eriguel	PDP–Laban	120,901	56.31
Dante Garcia	Partido Federal ng Pilipinas	68,142	31.74
Tomas M. Dumpit Sr	Katipunan ng Demokratikong Pilipino	24,881	11.59
Teodoro B. Agaceta	Independent	781	0.36
Total		214,705	100.00

== Laguna ==
=== 1st District ===
Candidate	Party	Votes	%
Danilo Ramon S. Fernandez	PDP–Laban	188,929	100.00
Total		188,929	100.00

=== 2nd District ===
Candidate	Party	Votes	%
Ruth B. Mariano-Hernandez	Independent	76,652	36.17
Efraim C. Genuino	Independent	68,371	32.26
Isidro L. Hemedes Jr.	Independent	44,168	20.84
Jaime G. Caringal	Independent	20,046	9.46
Tirso L. Laviña	Partido Demokratiko Sosyalista ng Pilipinas	1,587	0.75
Rosauro C. Revilla	Democratic Party of the Philippines	1,100	0.52
Total		211,924	100.00

=== 3rd District ===
Candidate	Party	Votes	%
Marisol C. Aragones-Sampelo	Nacionalista Party	214,899	95.73
Ma. Cristina T. Villamor	Independent	6,078	2.71
King G. Mediano	Independent	3,508	1.56
Total		224,485	100.00

=== 4th District ===
Candidate	Party	Votes	%
Benjamin Agarao Jr.	PDP–Laban	146,602	58.06
Antonio M. Carolino	Nacionalista Party	105,886	41.94
Total		252,488	100.00

== Lanao del Norte ==
=== 1st District ===
Candidate	Party	Votes	%
Mohamad Khalid Dimaporo	PDP–Laban	88,951	84.02
Florendo B. Opay	Independent	9,042	8.54
Solaiman M. Garlan	Pederalismo ng Dugong Dakilang Samahan	6,073	5.74
Mamosaka P. Maute	Independent	1,804	1.70
Total		105,870	100.00

=== 2nd District ===
Candidate	Party	Votes	%
Abdullah D. Dimaporo	Nationalist People's Coalition	93,199	69.47
Sonaya T. Mutia	Partido Federal ng Pilipinas	39,965	29.79
Sittie-Nadjiya M. Mapandi	Partido Federal ng Pilipinas	985	0.73
Total		134,149	100.00

== Lanao del Sur ==
=== 1st District ===
Candidate	Party	Votes	%
Ansaruddin Abdul Malik A. Adiong	Nacionalista Party	114,330	57.90
Rolan Abdul Rashid A. Macarambon	PDP–Laban	81,380	41.21
Ansaroden Magangcong Sani B. Lucman Moner	Pederalismo ng Dugong Dakilang Samahan	1,768	0.90
Total		197,478	100.00

=== 2nd District ===
Candidate	Party	Votes	%
Yasser Balindong	Lakas–CMD	35,617	24.09
Farouk A. Macarambon Jr	Nacionalista Party	33,289	22.52
Harun Al-Rashid A. Lucman Jr	Liberal Party	27,461	18.58
Abol Alam A. Padate	Partido Federal ng Pilipinas	25,895	17.52
Mauyag B. Papandayan Jr.	PDP–Laban	25,570	17.30
Total		147,832	100.00

== Lapu-Lapu City ==
Candidate	Party	Votes	%
Paz C. Radaza	Lakas–CMD	76,645	52.38
Eugenio S. Espedido	PDP–Laban	62,784	42.91
Karina Virginia Perpetua R. Cabahug	United Nationalist Alliance	5,268	3.60
Pablo Q. Doronio Jr	WPP	1,623	1.11
Total		146,320	100.00

== Las Piñas ==
Candidate	Party	Votes	%
Camille A. Villar-Genuino	Nacionalista Party	173,917	89.78
Jerry L. delos Reyes	Independent	19,791	10.22
Total		193,708	100.00

== Leyte ==
=== 1st District ===
Candidate	Party	Votes	%
Ferdinand Martin G. Romualdez	Lakas–CMD	160,401	94.26
Lino A. Dumas	Partido Federal ng Pilipinas	9,764	5.74
Total		170,165	100.00

=== 2nd District ===
Candidate	Party	Votes	%
Lolita Javier	Partido Federal ng Pilipinas	112,989	55.39
Henry C. Ong	PDP–Laban	88,995	43.63
Alberto N. Hidalgo	Independent	1,509	0.74
Niccolo J. Villasin	Independent	484	0.24
Total		203,977	100.00

=== 3rd District ===
Candidate	Party	Votes	%
Vicente Sofronio E. Veloso III	National Unity Party	53,581	55.47
Andres D. Salvacion Jr	Nationalist People's Coalition	43,012	44.53
Total		96,593	100.00

=== 4th District ===
Candidate	Party	Votes	%
Lucy Marie M. Torres-Gomez	PDP–Laban	178,919	77.77
Eufrocino C. Codilla Jr.	Lakas–CMD	51,155	22.23
Total		230,074	100.00

=== 5th District ===
Candidate	Party	Votes	%
Carl Nicolas C. Cari	Partido Federal ng Pilipinas	123,572	66.86
Marilou V. Galenzoga-Baligod	Nationalist People's Coalition	60,395	32.68
Baldomero Falcone	Independent	858	0.46
Total		184,825	100.00

== Maguindanao ==
=== 1st District ===
Candidate	Party	Votes	%
Datu Roonie Q. Sinsuat Sr.	PDP–Laban	125,481	46.68
Muslimin Sema	Nacionalista Party	78,361	29.15
Jamayel G. Dumama	Nationalist People's Coalition	51,892	19.30
Bai Sendig Dilangalen	Partido Federal ng Pilipinas	13,102	4.87
Total		268,836	100.00

=== 2nd District ===
Candidate	Party	Votes	%
Esmael Mangudadatu	PDP–Laban	124,385	54.99
Nathaniel S. Midtimbang	Nacionalista Party	101,399	44.83
Nasrudin B. Intok	Independent	396	0.18
Total		226,180	100.00

== Makati ==
=== 1st District ===
Candidate	Party	Votes	%
Romulo V. Peña Jr.	Liberal Party	71,035	51.40
Jejomar Binay	United Nationalist Alliance	65,229	47.20
Brigido P. Mesina Jr	Independent	1,213	0.88
Ferdinand T. Sevilla	Independent	728	0.53
Total		138,205	100.00

=== 2nd District ===
Candidate	Party	Votes	%
Luis Jose Angel N. Campos Jr.	Nationalist People's Coalition	90,736	57.44
Nemesio S. Yabut Jr.	PDP–Laban	63,245	40.04
Rodolfo D. Flores	Independent	2,293	1.45
Ricardo L. Opoc	Independent	1,687	1.07
Total		157,961	100.00

== Malabon ==
Candidate	Party	Votes	%
Josephine Veronique R. Lacson-Noel	Nationalist People's Coalition	86,001	56.72
Federico S. Sandoval II	PDP–Laban	65,629	43.28
Total		151,630	100.00

== Mandaluyong ==
Candidate	Party	Votes	%
Neptali Gonzales II	PDP–Laban	127,268	100.00
Total		127,268	100.00

== Manila ==
=== 1st District ===
Candidate	Party	Votes	%
Manuel Luis T. Lopez	Nationalist People's Coalition	86,993	54.27
Benjamin R. Asilo	Pwersa ng Masang Pilipino	73,306	45.73
Total		160,299	100.00

=== 2nd District ===
Candidate	Party	Votes	%
Rolando M. Valeriano	Asenso Manileño	34,861	36.52
Alexander T. Lopez	Nacionalista Party	32,215	33.75
Rodolfo N. Lacsamana	National Unity Party	28,379	29.73
Total		95,455	100.00

=== 3rd District ===
Candidate	Party	Votes	%
John Marvin C. Nieto	PDP–Laban	65,153	67.81
Maria Zenaida A. Benedicto-Angping	Lakas–CMD	30,925	32.19
Total		96,078	100.00

=== 4th District ===
Candidate	Party	Votes	%
Edward Maceda	Pwersa ng Masang Pilipino	63,298	60.19
Maria Theresa B. Bonoan-David	National Unity Party	30,238	28.76
Christopher S. Gabriel	Independent	11,621	11.05
Total		105,157	100.00

=== 5th District ===
Candidate	Party	Votes	%
Amanda Christina L. Bagatsing	KABAKA	65,836	50.42
Arnold I. Atienza	Lakas–CMD	64,748	49.58
Total		130,584	100.00

=== 6th District ===
Candidate	Party	Votes	%
Bienvenido M. Abante Jr	Asenso Manileño	49,795	46.21
Patricia Yvette M. Ocampo-Desiongco	Bagumbayan–VNP	33,731	31.30
Casimiro C. Sison	Pwersa ng Masang Pilipino	24,239	22.49
Total		107,765	100.00

== Marikina ==
=== 1st District ===
Candidate	Party	Votes	%
Bayani Fernando	Nationalist People's Coalition	56,553	80.46
Jose Fabian Cadiz	Liberal Party	13,732	19.54
Total		70,285	100.00

=== 2nd District ===
Candidate	Party	Votes	%
Stella Luz F. Alabastro-Quimbo	Liberal Party	79,598	83.74
Eugene Michael B. De Vera	Independent	13,995	14.72
Mauro R. Arce	Independent	1,461	1.54
Total		95,054	100.00

== Marinduque ==
Candidate	Party	Votes	%
Lord Allan Jay Q. Velasco	PDP–Laban	95,067	94.54
Harold K. Lim	United Nationalist Alliance	5,488	5.46
Total		100,555	100.00

== Masbate ==
=== 1st District ===
Candidate	Party	Votes	%
Narciso Bravo Jr.	National Unity Party	40,293	50.72
Zacarina A. Lazaro	PDP–Laban	39,144	49.28
Total		79,437	100.00

=== 2nd District ===
Candidate	Party	Votes	%
Elisa Olga T. Kho	PDP–Laban	124,505	77.98
Jo Kristine C. Revil	National Unity Party	35,157	22.02
Total		159,662	100.00

=== 3rd District ===
Candidate	Party	Votes	%
Wilton Kho	PDP–Laban	94,366	64.25
Rizalina Seachon-Lanete	Nationalist People's Coalition	52,513	35.75
Total		146,879	100.00

== Misamis Occidental ==
=== 1st District ===
Candidate	Party	Votes	%
Diego C. Ty	National Unity Party	72,070	50.71
Jason P. Almonte	Nacionalista Party	69,337	48.78
Bonifacio O. Macas	Bagumbayan-VNP	724	0.51
Total		142,131	100.00

=== 2nd District ===
Candidate	Party	Votes	%
Henry S. Oaminal Sr	Nacionalista Party	126,863	79.27
Herminia M. Ramiro	National Unity Party	33,182	20.73
Total		160,045	100.00

== Misamis Oriental ==
=== 1st District ===
Candidate	Party	Votes	%
Christian S. Unabia	Lakas–CMD	103,211	53.63
Jose Mari G. Pelaez	National Unity Party	86,042	44.71
Cancio Nicanor M. Guibone Jr	Independent	2,290	1.19
Alberto C. Tamayo	Partido Federal ng Pilipinas	895	0.47
Total		192,438	100.00

=== 2nd District ===
Candidate	Party	Votes	%
Juliette Uy	National Unity Party	159,078	64.44
Jose Benjamin Benaldo	Padayon Pilipino	74,508	30.18
Augusto H. Baculio Jr	Independent	13,269	5.38
Total		246,855	100.00

== Mountain Province ==
Candidate	Party	Votes	%
Maximo Y. Dalog Jr.	Nacionalista Party	25,701	31.72
Avelino C. Amangyen	Independent	17,778	21.94
Jupiter C. Dominguez	Independent	17,366	21.44
Anthony D. Wooden	PDP–Laban	11,004	13.58
Allen S. Ocden	Partido Federal ng Pilipinas	8,880	10.96
Abrian C. Libang	People's Reform Party	185	0.23
Albert G. Paday-os	Independent	102	0.13
Total		81,016	100.00

== Muntinlupa ==
Candidate	Party	Votes	%
Rozzano Rufino B. Biazon	PDP–Laban	169,756	81.46
Rafael R. Arciaga	United Nationalist Alliance	36,317	17.43
Rodolfo A. Llorca	Pederalismo ng Dugong Dakilang Samahan	2,326	1.12
Total		208,399	100.00

== Navotas ==
Candidate	Party	Votes	%
John Reynald M. Tiangco	Partido Navoteño	80,774	72.74
Maria Lourdes S. Del Rosario-Tumangan	Aksyon Demokratiko	30,267	27.26
Total		111,041	100.00

== Negros Occidental ==
=== 1st District ===
Candidate	Party	Votes	%
Gerardo P. Valmayor Jr	Nationalist People's Coalition	106,916	89.23
Ernesto L. Librando	Independent	7,356	6.14
Romulo T. Guion	Pederalismo ng Dugong Dakilang Samahan	5,555	4.64
Total		119,827	100.00

=== 2nd District ===
Candidate	Party	Votes	%
Leo Rafael M. Cueva	National Unity Party/United Negros Alliance	87,581	100.00
Total		87,581	100.00

=== 3rd District ===
Candidate	Party	Votes	%
Jose Francisco B. Benitez	PDP–Laban	173,352	100.00
Total		173,352	100.00

=== 4th District ===
Candidate	Party	Votes	%
Juliet Marie B. de Leon-Ferrer	National Unity Party/United Negros Alliance	134,041	96.05
Enrique C. Erobas	Independent	3,511	2.52
Ann Joan S. Lenling	Pederalismo ng Dugong Dakilang Samahan	2,004	1.44
Total		139,556	100.00

=== 5th District ===
Candidate	Party	Votes	%
Ma. Lourdes T. Arroyo-Lesaca	Lakas–CMD/United Negros Alliance	105,227	100.00
Total		105,227	100.00

=== 6th District ===
Candidate	Party	Votes	%
Genaro M. Alvarez Jr	Nationalist People's Coalition	152,345	91.57
Joaquin B. Bilbao Jr	Independent	14,031	8.43
Total		166,376	100.00

== Negros Oriental ==
=== 1st District ===
Candidate	Party	Votes	%
Jocelyn Sy-Limkaichong	Liberal Party	131,599	87.83
Pancracio S. Paras	Lakas–CMD	16,071	10.73
Danilo C. Roble	Independent	2,172	1.45
Total		149,842	100.00

=== 2nd District ===
Candidate	Party	Votes	%
Manuel T. Sagarbarria Sr	Nationalist People's Coalition	168,434	92.22
Jimmy P. Merto	Independent	7,394	4.05
Ryan B. Ybañez	Independent	6,823	3.74
Total		182,651	100.00

=== 3rd District ===
Candidate	Party	Votes	%
Arnolfo A. Teves Jr.	PDP–Laban	118,970	100.00
Total		118,970	100.00

== Northern Samar ==
=== 1st District ===
Candidate	Party	Votes	%
Paul Daza	Liberal Party	116,209	67.28
Harlin C. Abayon Jr	Nacionalista Party	56,524	32.72
Total		172,733	100.00

=== 2nd District ===
Candidate	Party	Votes	%
Jose Ong Jr.	PDP–Laban	77,397	81.19
Reyzandro A. Unay	Independent	17,934	18.81
Total		95,331	100.00

== Nueva Ecija ==
=== 1st District ===
Candidate	Party	Votes	%
Estrellita B. Suansing	PDP–Laban	149,697	60.38
Rommel Padilla	Independent	98,240	39.62
Total		247,937	100.00

=== 2nd District ===
Candidate	Party	Votes	%
Micaela O. Salvador-Violago	National Unity Party	140,915	73.89
Joselito F. Violago	Independent	49,795	26.11
Total		190,710	100.00

=== 3rd District ===
Candidate	Party	Votes	%
Rosanna Vergara	PDP–Laban	160,298	57.05
Czarina Umali	Unang Sigaw	120,674	42.95
Total		280,972	100.00

=== 4th District ===
Candidate	Party	Votes	%
Maricel G. Natividad-Nagaño	People's Reform Party	137,829	51.96
Magnolia Rosa C. Antonino-Nadres	National Unity Party	125,666	47.37
Roberto E. Punongbayan Jr	Pederalismo ng Dugong Dakilang Samahan	1,769	0.67
Total		265,264	100.00

== Nueva Vizcaya ==
Candidate	Party	Votes	%
Luisa Cuaresma	National Unity Party	114,338	56.08
Ruth R. Padilla	Nacionalista Party	88,459	43.39
Lawrence S. Sta. Ana	Independent	1,073	0.53
Total		203,870	100.00

== Occidental Mindoro ==
Candidate	Party	Votes	%
Josephine Y. Ramirez-Sato	Liberal Party	130,607	67.00
Juan M. Sanchez	National Unity Party	64,326	33.00
Total		194,933	100.00

== Oriental Mindoro ==
=== 1st District ===
Candidate	Party	Votes	%
Paulino Salvador Leachon	PDP–Laban	114,552	56.10
Marilou F. Morillo	Partido Federal ng Pilipinas	89,655	43.90
Total		204,207	100.00

=== 2nd District ===
Candidate	Party	Votes	%
Alfonso Umali Jr.	Liberal Party	77,056	49.98
Manuel G. Andaya	PDP–Laban	63,856	41.42
Edmund Dante E. Janda	Lakas–CMD	13,251	8.60
Total		154,163	100.00

== Palawan ==
=== 1st District ===
Candidate	Party	Votes	%
Franz Josef George E. Alvarez	National Unity Party/PPP	131,764	100.00
Total		131,764	100.00

=== 2nd District ===
Candidate	Party	Votes	%
Cyrille F. Abueg-Zaldivar	PDP–Laban/PPP	112,960	85.00
Iko J. Ong	Independent	17,470	13.15
Magnolia May R. de Leon-San Jose	Independent	2,458	1.85
Total		132,888	100.00

=== 3rd District ===
Candidate	Party	Votes	%
Gil Acosta Jr.	Nationalist People's Coalition/PPP	72,850	61.08
Douglas S. Hagedorn	Pederalismo ng Dugong Dakilang Samahan	46,420	38.92
Total		119,270	100.00

== Pampanga ==
=== 1st District ===
Candidate	Party	Votes	%
Carmelo Lazatin II	PDP–Laban	152,169	57.89
Joseller M. Guiao	Kambilan	107,078	40.73
Bernadette S. David	Independent	3,622	1.38
Total		262,869	100.00

=== 2nd District ===
Candidate	Party	Votes	%
Juan Miguel M. Arroyo	Lakas–CMD	207,151	93.57
Apolinario G. Ponio	Independent	14,235	6.43
Total		221,386	100.00

=== 3rd District ===
Candidate	Party	Votes	%
Aurelio Gonzales Jr.	PDP–Laban/Kambilan	226,785	91.60
Cecilia C. Canlas	Independent	20,809	8.40
Total		247,594	100.00

=== 4th District ===
Candidate	Party	Votes	%
Juan Pablo Bondoc	PDP–Laban/Kambilan	173,460	69.33
Ricardo C. Yabut	Independent	75,055	30.00
Regino L. Mallari	Independent	1,670	0.67
Total		250,185	100.00

== Pangasinan ==
=== 1st District ===
Candidate	Party	Votes	%
Arthur Celeste	Nacionalista Party	101,234	51.54
Thomas Orbos	PDP–Laban	93,786	47.75
Ernesto R. Regaspi	Independent	1,398	0.71
Total		196,418	100.00

=== 2nd District ===
Candidate	Party	Votes	%
Jumel Anthony I. Espino	PDP–Laban	129,371	52.19
Raul P. Sison	Nacionalista Party	109,639	44.23
Roberto A. Merrera Jr.	Independent	8,864	3.58
Total		247,874	100.00

=== 3rd District ===
Candidate	Party	Votes	%
Rose Marie B. Jimenez-Arenas	PDP–Laban	242,465	83.67
Felipe P. De Vera Jr	National Unity Party	41,653	14.37
Jaime G. Aquino	Independent	5,655	1.95
Total		289,773	100.00

=== 4th District ===
Candidate	Party	Votes	%
Christopher George Martin P. de Venecia	Lakas–CMD	166,917	73.22
Alipio Vittorio Ramon D. Fernandez	Independent	43,718	19.18
Redford Christian P. Erfe-Mejia	Independent	15,655	6.87
Teodoro Wilhelm C. Manaois	Independent	1,680	0.74
Total		227,970	100.00

=== 5th District ===
Candidate	Party	Votes	%
Ramon Guico III	Lakas–CMD	125,136	50.71
Amado Espino Jr.	PDP–Laban	121,624	49.29
Total		246,760	100.00

=== 6th District ===
Candidate	Party	Votes	%
Tyrone D. Agabas	Nationalist People's Coalition	202,978	93.73
Myrna P. Custodio	Independent	13,568	6.27
Total		216,546	100.00

== Parañaque ==
=== 1st District ===
Candidate	Party	Votes	%
Eric Olivarez	PDP–Laban	74,692	84.46
Jaime N. De Los Santos	Lakas–CMD	13,743	15.54
Total		88,435	100.00

=== 2nd District ===
Candidate	Party	Votes	%
Joy Myra Salvador-Tambunting	PDP–Laban	103,028	89.46
Pacifico C. Rosal	Independent	12,144	10.54
Total		115,172	100.00

== Pasay ==
Candidate	Party	Votes	%
Antonino Calixto	PDP–Laban	136,519	76.53
Efren L. Alas	Nationalist People's Coalition	22,372	12.54
Elmer G. Mitra Jr.	Independent	12,662	7.10
Metel Gelbolingo	Pederalismo ng Dugong Dakilang Samahan	3,980	2.23
Pedro G. Ordiales	Independent	2,850	1.60
Total		178,383	100.00

== Pasig ==
Candidate	Party	Votes	%
Roman Romulo	Aksyon Demokratiko	225,217	69.56
Richard C. Eusebio	Nacionalista Party	98,547	30.44
Total		323,764	100.00

== Quezon ==
=== 1st District ===
Candidate	Party	Votes	%
Wilfrido Mark M. Enverga Jr	Nationalist People's Coalition	183,999	100.00
Total		183,999	100.00

=== 2nd District ===
Candidate	Party	Votes	%
David C. Suarez	Nacionalista Party	178,285	57.12
Proceso Alcala	Liberal Party	125,629	40.25
Rosauro V. Masilang	Partido Federal ng Pilipinas	4,276	1.37
Amadeo Suarez	Aksyon Demokratiko	2,801	0.90
Christian Señeres	Democratic Party of the Philippines	1,110	0.36
Total		312,101	100.00

=== 3rd District ===
Candidate	Party	Votes	%
Aleta R. Catarina-Suarez	Lakas–CMD	132,870	84.20
Ronaldo G. de Luna	Aksyon Demokratiko	24,935	15.80
Total		157,805	100.00

=== 4th District ===
Candidate	Party	Votes	%
Angelina Tan	Nationalist People's Coalition	179,181	100.00
Total		179,181	100.00

== Quezon City ==
=== 1st District ===
Candidate	Party	Votes	%
Anthony Peter D. Crisologo	PDP–Laban	74,033	55.17
Elizabeth A. Delarmente	Nationalist People's Coalition	56,833	42.35
Andres R. Samson	Independent	3,327	2.48
Total		134,193	100.00

=== 2nd District ===
Candidate	Party	Votes	%
Mari Grace Preciosa H. Castelo	Nationalist People's Coalition	109,515	54.30
Mary Ann L. Susano	Katipunan ng Demokratikong Pilipino	48,924	24.26
Dante V. Liban	Partido Federal ng Pilipinas	23,089	11.45
Maria Cristina Winsell B. Beltran-Cordora	PDP–Laban	15,108	7.49
Virgilio R. Garcia	Independent	5,032	2.50
Total		201,668	100.00

=== 3rd District ===
Candidate	Party	Votes	%
Allan Benedict S. Reyes	Partido Federal ng Pilipinas	70,184	74.49
Dante M. De Guzman	PDP–Laban	22,204	23.57
Jessie C. Dignadice	Pederalismo ng Dugong Dakilang Samahan	1,826	1.94
Total		94,214	100.00

=== 4th District ===
Candidate	Party	Votes	%
Jesus Manuel C. Suntay	PDP–Laban	103,338	85.17
Francisco D. Rodriguez	Independent	17,991	14.83
Total		121,329	100.00

=== 5th District ===
Candidate	Party	Votes	%
Alfredo Paolo D. Vargas III	SBP	132,047	85.72
Angelito V. Francisco	Independent	9,064	5.88
Reynaldo B. Miranda Jr.	PDP–Laban	7,585	4.92
Joel Miranda	Lakas–CMD	2,813	1.83
Victor E. Francisco	Independent	2,527	1.64
Total		154,036	100.00

=== 6th District ===
Candidate	Party	Votes	%
Jose Christopher Y. Belmonte	Liberal Party	94,673	83.53
Juan Domino	PDP–Laban	17,067	15.06
Maria Cecilia F. Fabilane	Pederalismo ng Dugong Dakilang Samahan	1,604	1.42
Total		113,344	100.00

== Quirino ==
Candidate	Party	Votes	%
Junie E. Cua	PDP–Laban	76,320	100.00
Total		76,320	100.00

== Rizal ==
=== 1st District ===
Candidate	Party	Votes	%
Michael John R. Duavit	Nationalist People's Coalition	284,871	90.50
Catalino A. Dazo	Pederalismo ng Dugong Dakilang Samahan	29,902	9.50
Total		314,773	100.00

=== 2nd District ===
Candidate	Party	Votes	%
Juan Fidel Felipe F. Nograles	PDP–Laban	212,031	58.75
Ma. Lourdes H. Rodriguez	Nationalist People's Coalition	138,086	38.26
Dionisio Donato T. Garciano	National Unity Party	10,793	2.99
Total		360,910	100.00

== Romblon ==
Candidate	Party	Votes	%
Eleandro Jesus Madrona	Nacionalista Party	85,961	58.65
Eduardo C. Firmalo	Liberal Party	60,602	41.35
Total		146,563	100.00

== Samar ==
=== 1st District ===
Candidate	Party	Votes	%
Edgar Mary Sarmiento	Liberal Party	103,884	52.91
Stephen James T. Tan	Nacionalista Party	92,473	47.09
Total		196,357	100.00

=== 2nd District ===
Candidate	Party	Votes	%
Sharee Ann Tan	PDP–Laban	124,459	56.14
Christopher Francisco C. Bolastig	Lakas–CMD	97,236	43.86
Total		221,695	100.00

== San Jose del Monte ==
Candidate	Party	Votes	%
Florida Robes	PDP–Laban	89,031	53.26
Irene B. Del Rosario	National Unity Party	78,135	46.74
Total		167,166	100.00

== San Juan ==
Candidate	Party	Votes	%
Ronaldo Zamora	PDP–Laban	35,386	59.96
Eduardo Luis B. Manzano	Pwersa ng Masang Pilipino	23,627	40.04
Total		59,013	100.00

== Sarangani ==
Candidate	Party	Votes	%
Rogelio Pacquiao	PDP–Laban	182,491	94.94
Jacob L. Arroyo	Independent	9,729	5.06
Total		192,220	100.00

== Siquijor ==
Candidate	Party	Votes	%
Jake Vincent Villa	Nationalist People's Coalition	26,840	45.45
Ramon Vicente Antonio M. Rocamora	PDP–Laban	18,755	31.76
Orlando A. Fua Jr.	Independent	10,382	17.58
Marie Anne S. Pernes	Partido Federal ng Pilipinas	2,849	4.82
Demosthenes O. Fernandez	Independent	223	0.38
Total		59,049	100.00

== Sorsogon ==
=== 1st District ===
Candidate	Party	Votes	%
Evelina B. Guevara-Escudero	Nationalist People's Coalition	118,436	65.06
Christine R. Balita	PDP–Laban	62,051	34.08
Eddie O. Lotino	Partido Federal ng Pilipinas	1,564	0.86
Total		182,051	100.00

=== 2nd District ===
Candidate	Party	Votes	%
Ma. Bernardita B. Ramos	Nationalist People's Coalition	110,264	62.19
Robert Ante L. Rodrigueza	PDP–Laban	57,711	32.55
Randy G. Medina	Lakas–CMD	4,107	2.32
Juan E. Escandor Jr.	Independent	4,023	2.27
Pilar N. Holaso	Independent	665	0.38
Jose F. Gabales	Independent	531	0.30
Total		177,301	100.00

== South Cotabato ==
=== 1st District ===
Candidate	Party	Votes	%
Shirlyn Bañas-Nograles	PDP–Laban	194,929	68.55
Clemencia Dinopol-Cataluña	Independent	44,802	15.76
Arturo C. Cloma	Nationalist People's Coalition	42,005	14.77
Abelardo S. Plaza	Independent	2,615	0.92
Total		284,351	100.00

=== 2nd District ===
Candidate	Party	Votes	%
Ferdinand L. Hernandez	PDP–Laban	222,524	81.89
Marieta C. Causing	Partido Federal ng Pilipinas	47,516	17.49
Darius B. Solis	Independent	1,705	0.63
Total		271,745	100.00

== Southern Leyte ==
=== 1st District ===
Candidate	Party	Votes	%
Roger Mercado	PDP–Laban	141,255	84.75
Gerardo G. Dator	Lakas–CMD	25,413	15.25
Total		166,668	100.00

== Sultan Kudarat ==
=== 1st District ===
Candidate	Party	Votes	%
Bai Rihan M. Sakaluran-Abdurajak	National Unity Party	113,306	100.00
Total		113,306	100.00

=== 2nd District ===
Candidate	Party	Votes	%
Horacio P. Suansing Jr.	PDP–Laban	111,045	92.73
Ricardo C. Piad	Independent	8,709	7.27
Total		119,754	100.00

== Sulu ==
=== 1st District ===
Candidate	Party	Votes	%
Samier Tan	PDP–Laban	83,670	55.93
Yusop Jikiri	Lakas–CMD	65,928	44.07
Total		149,598	100.00

=== 2nd District ===
Candidate	Party	Votes	%
Abdulmunir Arbison Sr.	Nacionalista Party	49,617	58.02
Nurhaipa S. Berto	PDP–Laban	33,101	38.70
Abdulmunir N. Arbison Jr.	Lakas–CMD	2,550	2.98
Donimar B. Ajiji	Independent	256	0.30
Total		85,524	100.00

== Surigao del Norte ==
=== 1st District ===
Candidate	Party	Votes	%
Francisco Jose Matugas II	PDP–Laban	49,993	70.29
Mamerto Galanida	Nacionalista Party	21,127	29.71
Total		71,120	100.00

=== 2nd District ===
Candidate	Party	Votes	%
Robert Ace S. Barbers	Nacionalista Party	112,176	53.80
Sol F. Matugas	PDP–Laban	96,059	46.07
Roldan B. Rafols	Independent	274	0.13
Total		208,509	100.00

== Surigao del Sur ==
=== 1st District ===
Candidate	Party	Votes	%
Prospero Pichay Jr.	Lakas–CMD	102,361	61.12
Mary Elizabeth O. Ty	Pederalismo ng Dugong Dakilang Samahan	34,617	20.67
Gregorio T. Murillo Jr.	PDP–Laban	17,179	10.26
Godfre G. Murillo	Independent	11,795	7.04
Roselyn Te	Hugpong ng Pagbabago	816	0.49
Samuel R. Ronquillo	Nationalist People's Coalition	708	0.42
Total		167,476	100.00

=== 2nd District ===
Candidate	Party	Votes	%
Johnny Pimentel	PDP–Laban	105,034	88.05
Mamerto B. Alciso Jr.	Pederalismo ng Dugong Dakilang Samahan	14,250	11.95
Total		119,284	100.00

== Taguig ==
Candidate	Party	Votes	%
Maria Laarni C. Lopez-Cayetano	Nacionalista Party	113,226	72.94
Michelle Anne B. Gonzales	PDP–Laban	42,012	27.06
Total		155,238	100.00

== Taguig–Pateros ==
Candidate	Party	Votes	%
Alan Peter Cayetano	Nacionalista Party	81,243	62.60
Allan M. Cerafica	PDP–Laban	47,784	36.82
Gloria G. Cabrera	Independent	637	0.49
Kamarozaman T. Rajahmuda	Partido Federal ng Pilipinas	119	0.09
Total		129,783	100.00

== Tarlac ==
=== 1st District ===
Candidate	Party	Votes	%
Carlos O. Cojuangco	Nationalist People's Coalition	157,788	100.00
Total		157,788	100.00

=== 2nd District ===
Candidate	Party	Votes	%
Victor Yap	Nationalist People's Coalition	211,834	94.66
Jorge A. delos Reyes	Independent	11,949	5.34
Total		223,783	100.00

=== 3rd District ===
Candidate	Party	Votes	%
Noel L. Villanueva	Nationalist People's Coalition	135,449	73.97
Hariking P. David	PDP–Laban	44,678	24.40
Bertito T. del Mundo	Independent	2,991	1.63
Total		183,118	100.00

== Tawi-Tawi ==
Candidate	Party	Votes	%
Rashidin H. Matba	National Unity Party	87,035	55.48
Ruby Sahali	PDP–Laban	69,033	44.01
Kiram H. Kamaluddin	Pederalismo ng Dugong Dakilang Samahan	499	0.32
Putli Zenaida Baby J. Ibnohajil	Independent	302	0.19
Total		156,869	100.00

== Valenzuela ==
=== 1st District ===
Candidate	Party	Votes	%
Weslie T. Gatchalian	Nationalist People's Coalition	119,372	100.00
Total		119,372	100.00

=== 2nd District ===
Candidate	Party	Votes	%
Eric Martinez	PDP–Laban	95,878	71.65
Magtanggol T. Gunigundo Jr.	Lakas–CMD	37,935	28.35
Total		133,813	100.00

== Zambales ==
=== 1st District ===
Candidate	Party	Votes	%
Jeffrey D. Khonghun	Nacionalista Party	115,172	70.37
Ma. Milagros E. Habana-Magsaysay	Partido Federal ng Pilipinas	47,125	28.79
Allan G. Avila	Independent	1,360	0.83
Total		163,657	100.00

=== 2nd District ===
Candidate	Party	Votes	%
Cheryl P. Deloso-Montalla	Liberal Party	134,801	69.99
Wilfredo Paul D. Pangan	PDP–Laban	57,801	30.01
Total		192,602	100.00

== Zamboanga City ==
=== 1st District ===
Candidate	Party	Votes	%
Cesar L. Jimenez Jr.	Nationalist People's Coalition	37,804	31.45
Jose L. Lobregat	Adelante Zamboanga Party	29,102	24.21
Rodolfo M. Bayot	National Unity Party	28,212	23.47
Cesar F. Climaco Jr.	Independent	14,549	12.10
Wendell F. Sotto	Independent	6,803	5.66
Taib H. Nasaron	Pederalismo ng Dugong Dakilang Samahan	3,104	2.58
Daniel S. Nuevo	Independent	645	0.54
Total		120,219	100.00

=== 2nd District ===
Candidate	Party	Votes	%
Manuel Jose M. Dalipe	Nationalist People's Coalition	82,796	61.18
Lilia M. Nuño	Nacionalista Party	31,951	23.61
Cesar S. Iturralde	Independent	12,059	8.91
Erico Basilio A. Fabian	Independent	6,309	4.66
Jonathan F. Perez	Independent	2,219	1.64
Total		135,334	100.00

== Zamboanga del Norte ==
=== 1st District ===
Candidate	Party	Votes	%
Romeo M. Jalosjos Jr.	Nacionalista Party	64,282	52.60
Roberto T. Uy Jr.	PDP–Laban	57,937	47.40
Total		122,219	100.00

=== 2nd District ===
Candidate	Party	Votes	%
Glona Labadlabad	PDP–Laban	105,319	54.30
Flora L. Villarosa	Nacionalista Party	88,638	45.70
Total		193,957	100.00

=== 3rd District ===
Candidate	Party	Votes	%
Isagani Amatong	Liberal Party	91,319	57.17
Norbideiri B. Edding	Nacionalista Party	68,418	42.83
Total		159,737	100.00

== Zamboanga del Sur ==
=== 1st District ===
Candidate	Party	Votes	%
Divina Grace Yu	PDP–Laban	164,990	57.94
Marlyn N. Revelo	Nacionalista Party	119,141	41.84
Orville B. Largo	Pederalismo ng Dugong Dakilang Samahan	640	0.22
Total		284,771	100.00

=== 2nd District ===
Candidate	Party	Votes	%
Leonardo L. Babasa Jr.	PDP–Laban	94,362	51.72
Antonio Cerilles	Nationalist People's Coalition	88,074	48.28
Total		182,436	100.00

== Zamboanga Sibugay ==
=== 1st District ===
Candidate	Party	Votes	%
Wilter Palma II	PDP–Laban	61,302	54.39
Anna Florence A. Cabilao-Yambao	Nacionalista Party	48,744	43.25
Omar B. Karim	Independent	2,352	2.09
Reynaldo N. Tecechian	Independent	314	0.28
Total		112,712	100.00

=== 2nd District ===
Candidate	Party	Votes	%
Dulce Ann K. Hofer-Santos	PDP–Laban	96,788	62.30
Antonieta R. Eudela-Aniñon	Pwersa ng Masang Pilipino	58,572	37.70
Total		155,360	100.00
