= 2022 Philippine House of Representatives elections in the Ilocos Region =

- May 9, 2022
- All 12 Ilocos Region seats in the House of Representatives
Party	Seats	+/–
NPC	4	+2
Nacionalista	3	0
PDP–Laban	2	−2
Lakas	2	0
PRP	1	New
This lists parties that won seats. See the complete results below.

The 2022 Philippine House of Representatives elections in the Ilocos Region were held on May 9, 2022.

== Summary ==
Congressional district	Incumbent	Incumbent's party	Winner	Winner's party	Winning margin
Ilocos Norte–1st	Ria Christina Fariñas	PDP–Laban	Sandro Marcos	Nacionalista	13.26%
Ilocos Norte–2nd	Eugenio Angelo Barba	Nacionalista	Eugenio Angelo Barba	Nacionalista	59.96%
Ilocos Sur–1st	Deogracias Victor Savellano	Nacionalista	Ronald Singson	NPC	14.96%
Ilocos Sur–2nd	Kristine Singson-Meehan	NPC	Kristine Singson-Meehan	NPC	Unopposed
La Union–1st	Pablo Ortega	NPC	Paolo Ortega	NPC	57.46%
La Union–2nd	Sandra Eriguel	Lakas	Dante Garcia	PRP	8.28%
Pangasinan–1st	Arnold Celeste	Nacionalista	Arthur Celeste	Nacionalista	30.38%
Pangasinan–2nd	Jumel Anthony Espino	PDP–Laban	Mark Cojuangco	NPC	4.98%
Pangasinan–3rd	Rose Marie Arenas	PDP–Laban	Maria Rachel Arenas	PDP–Laban	82.77%
Pangasinan–4th	Christopher de Venecia	Lakas	Christopher de Venecia	Lakas	60.06%
Pangasinan–5th	Ramon Guico III	Nacionalista	Ramon Guico Jr.	Lakas	18.80%
Pangasinan–6th	Tyrone Agabas	NPC	Marlyn Primicias-Agabas	PDP–Laban	85.40%

== Ilocos Norte ==
=== 1st district ===
Incumbent Ria Christina Fariñas of PDP–Laban ran for a second term.

Fariñas was defeated by Sandro Marcos of the Nacionalista Party, son of former senator and presidential candidate Bongbong Marcos.

Candidate	Party	Votes	%
Sandro Marcos	Nacionalista Party	108,423	56.63
Ria Christina Fariñas (incumbent)	PDP–Laban	83,034	43.37
Total		191,457	100.00
Total votes		196,629	–
Registered voters/turnout		228,024	86.23
Nacionalista hold			
Source: Commission on Elections

=== 2nd district ===
Incumbent Eugenio Angelo Barba of the Nacionalista Party ran for a second term.

Barba won re-election against former Batac vice mayor Jeffrey Jubal Nalupta (Partido para sa Demokratikong Reporma) and Juanito Antonio (PDP–Laban).

Candidate	Party	Votes	%
Eugenio Angelo Barba (incumbent)	Nacionalista Party	127,867	79.08
Jeffrey Jubal Nalupta	Partido para sa Demokratikong Reporma	30,920	19.12
Juanito Antonio	PDP–Laban	2,897	1.79
Total		161,684	100.00
Total votes		184,092	–
Registered voters/turnout		206,090	89.33
Nacionalista hold			
Source: Commission on Elections

== Ilocos Sur ==
=== 1st district ===
Incumbent Deogracias Victor Savellano of the Nacionalista Party ran for a third term.

Savellano was defeated by former representative Ronald Singson of the Nationalist People's Coalition.

Candidate	Party	Votes	%
Ronald Singson	Nationalist People's Coalition	99,376	57.48
Deogracias Victor Savellano (incumbent)	Nacionalista Party	73,503	42.52
Total		172,879	100.00
Total votes		181,982	–
Registered voters/turnout		201,188	90.45
NPC gain from Nacionalista			
Source: Commission on Elections

=== 2nd district ===
Incumbent Kristine Singson-Meehan of the Nationalist People's Coalition won re-election for a second term unopposed. She was previously affiliated with the Bileg Party.

Candidate	Party	Votes	%
Kristine Singson-Meehan (incumbent)	Nationalist People's Coalition	180,953	100.00
Total		180,953	100.00
Total votes		242,711	–
Registered voters/turnout		275,796	88.00
NPC hold			
Source: Commission on Elections

== La Union ==
=== 1st district ===
Incumbent Pablo Ortega of the Nationalist People's Coalition (NPC) retired.

The NPC nominated Ortega's son, provincial board member Paolo Ortega, who won the election against two other candidates.

Candidate	Party	Votes	%
Paolo Ortega	Nationalist People's Coalition	144,295	76.80
Migz Magsaysay	Workers' and Peasants' Party	36,330	19.34
Mario Rodriguez	Independent	7,247	3.86
Total		187,872	100.00
Total votes		213,909	–
Registered voters/turnout		243,178	87.96
NPC hold			
Source: Commission on Elections

=== 2nd district ===
Incumbent Sandra Eriguel of Lakas–CMD ran for a third term. She was previously affiliated with PDP–Laban.

Eriguel was defeated by former Tubao mayor Dante Garcia of the People's Reform Party.

Candidate	Party	Votes	%
Dante Garcia	People's Reform Party	134,938	54.14
Sandra Eriguel (incumbent)	Lakas–CMD	114,314	45.86
Total		249,252	100.00
Total votes		257,322	–
Registered voters/turnout		295,552	87.06
PRP gain from Lakas			
Source: Commission on Elections

== Pangasinan ==
=== 1st district ===
Incumbent Arnold Celeste of the Nacionalista Party ran for mayor of Agno.

The Nacionalista Party nominated former Alaminos mayor Arthur Celeste, who won the election against former Pangasinan governor Oscar Orbos (Aksyon Demokratiko).

Candidate	Party	Votes	%
Arthur Celeste	Nacionalista Party	155,372	65.19
Oscar Orbos	Aksyon Demokratiko	82,983	34.81
Total		238,355	100.00
Total votes		255,660	–
Registered voters/turnout		294,221	86.89
Nacionalista hold			
Source: Commission on Elections

=== 2nd district ===
Incumbent Jumel Espino of PDP–Laban ran for a second term.

Espino was defeated by former Pangasinan's 5th district representative Mark Cojuangco of the Nationalist People's Coalition. Roberto Merrera Jr. (Partido Pederal ng Maharlika) also ran for representative.

Candidate	Party	Votes	%
Mark Cojuangco	Nationalist People's Coalition	152,077	51.73
Jumel Espino (incumbent)	PDP–Laban	137,431	46.75
Roberto Merrera Jr.	Partido Pederal ng Maharlika	4,454	1.52
Total		293,962	100.00
Total votes		309,536	–
Registered voters/turnout		351,684	88.02
NPC gain from PDP–Laban			
Source: Commission on Elections

=== 3rd district ===
Incumbent Rose Marie Arenas of PDP–Laban was term-limited.

PDP–Laban nominated Arenas' daughter, former Movie and Television Review and Classification Board chairperson Maria Rachel Arenas, who won the election against two other candidates.

Candidate	Party	Votes	%
Maria Rachel Arenas	PDP–Laban	311,862	90.47
Generoso Mamaril	Partido Pilipino sa Pagbabago	26,555	7.70
Teodoro Cabral	Partido Pederal ng Maharlika	6,302	1.83
Total		344,719	100.00
Total votes		382,636	–
Registered voters/turnout		441,956	86.58
PDP–Laban hold			
Source: Commission on Elections

=== 4th district ===
Incumbent Christopher de Venecia of Lakas–CMD ran for a third term.

De Venecia won re-election against former Dagupan vice mayor Alvin Fernandez (Independent).

Candidate	Party	Votes	%
Christopher de Venecia (incumbent)	Lakas–CMD	213,020	80.03
Alipio Fernandez	Independent	53,162	19.97
Total		266,182	100.00
Total votes		299,802	–
Registered voters/turnout		340,564	88.03
Lakas hold			
Source: Commission on Elections

=== 5th district ===
Incumbent Ramon Guico III of the Nacionalista Party ran for governor of Pangasinan. He was previously affiliated with Lakas–CMD.

Guico endorsed his father, Binalonan mayor Ramon Guico Jr. (Lakas–CMD), who won the election against former provincial board member Niño Arboleda (PDP–Laban).

Candidate	Party	Votes	%
Ramon Guico Jr.	Lakas–CMD	166,921	59.40
Niño Arboleda	PDP–Laban	114,079	40.60
Total		281,000	100.00
Total votes		306,719	–
Registered voters/turnout		352,414	87.03
Lakas gain from Nacionalista			
Source: Commission on Elections

=== 6th district ===
Incumbent Tyrone Agabas of the Nationalist People's Coalition ran for mayor of Tayug.

Agabas endorsed his wife, Marlyn Primicias-Agabas (PDP–Laban), who won the election against Pilo Villamar (Kilusang Bagong Lipunan).

Candidate	Party	Votes	%
Marlyn Primicias-Agabas	PDP–Laban	233,397	92.70
Pilo Villamar	Kilusang Bagong Lipunan	18,393	7.30
Total		251,790	100.00
Total votes		273,843	–
Registered voters/turnout		316,097	86.63
PDP–Laban gain from NPC			
Source: Commission on Elections
