= Eufranio Eriguel =

Filipino medical doctor and politician

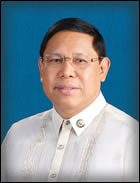
- Official portrait, 2013

Member of the Philippine House of Representatives from La Union's 2nd district
- In office June 30, 2010 – June 30, 2016
- Preceded by: Tomas L. Dumpit Jr.
- Succeeded by: Sandra Eriguel

Mayor of Agoo
- In office June 30, 1998 – June 30, 2007

Personal details
- Born: Eufranio Chan Eriguel; June 12, 1959 San Fernando, La Union, Philippines
- Died: May 12, 2018 (aged 58) Agoo, La Union, Philippines
- Party: NPC (2009–2018)
- Other political affiliations: Lakas (until 2009)

Eufranio "Franny" Chan Eriguel, M.D. (June 12, 1959 – May 12, 2018) was a Filipino medical doctor and politician from La Union, who was assassinated in an ambush on May 12, 2018.

== Early life ==
Eufranio “Franny” Chan Eriguel was born to Dr. Eufemio Fangonil Eriguel and Bibiana Marsan Chan on June 12, 1959 in San Fernando, La Union and was the eldest of 9 siblings.

His early education consisted of graduating Salutatorian at Agoo East Central School. He continued on to attend Southern La Union National High School (DMMMSU) for his secondary education and graduated 1st Honorable Mention. He managed to top the National College Entrance Exam (NCEE), now known as the National Career Assessment Examination (NCAE) with a score of 99%. Eriguel went on to study at the University of Santo Tomas where he pursued a pre-medical school degree, BS General Medicine. He completed his medical school degree in 1983 in the same university.

Eriguel worked as a doctor, serving as a Military Doctor for Camp Dangwa Region 1 Benguet, and eventually, as a Company Doctor at the Philippine Tourism Authority. He ended up leaving the country to find more work opportunities in the United States.

Eriguel came back to the Philippines in 1995 after the death of his father, who was then Vice Mayor of Agoo, La Union.

== Mayor of Agoo ==
Eriguel was elected Mayor of Agoo in 1998, serving until 2007. During his term, Agoo underwent various redevelopments and started various programs and events enabling it to reap regional and national awards such as the Hall of Fame Awardee as the Cleanest, Safest and Greenest Municipality - 1st to 3rd Class Municipality Category (Gawad Pangulo sa Kapaligiran) Regional and National Level.

In 2002-04, Agoo ranked 1st in the Department of Education's National Literacy Award as Most Outstanding LGU. In 2009, Agoo won Best LGU (1st - 3rd Class Municipality Category) in Literacy Promotion (2-time National and Regional Champion). Eriguel also served as the president for the Mayor's League of Municipalities of the Philippines from 1998 to 2007.

=== Town Plaza commercialization and other events ===
During his term as Mayor, Eriguel was involved in the construction of a commercial building within the premises of the town plaza —a redevelopment which the Supreme Court later ruled to be "irregular" in the "Land Bank of the Philippines v. Cacayuran" ruling. The decision "penalizes abusive municipal officials" even beyond their terms, and is considered a landmark case in Philippine jurisprudence. However, the court later granted a motion for reconsideration regarding the case on May 15, 2015, because the Municipality of Agoo had not been implicated in the original case.

Another redevelopment which took place was the partial conversion of the Museo de Iloko into a franchise of fast food giant Chowking. The Don Eufemio F. Eriguel Memorial National High School, named after Eriguel's father, was also established during his term.

Eriguel was succeeded by his wife Sandra as Mayor in 2007. Eriguel was then appointed as an adviser to the provincial government of La Union for municipal affairs—a post he held until June 30, 2010.

== Congressman for the Second District of La Union ==
In the elections of May 10, 2010, Eriguel was elected as a member of the House of Representatives as a candidate for the Nationalist People's Coalition (NPC), representing the 2nd District of La Union. During his term as Congressman for the Second District of La Union, Eriguel served as chair of the House Committee on Health and was among the members of the bicameral committee that passed the Graphic Health Warning bill. As chair, Eriguel co-authored and pushed for the passing of various bills related to the health and wellness of Filipinos. This includes, but is not limited to, mandatory healthcare, mandatory immunization of hepatitis-B for infants, and the declaration of National Thyroid Cancer Awareness Week.

=== Agoo-Aringay cityhood proposal and other events ===
On June 11, 2014, Eriguel filed House Bill 4644 in an attempt to create a new city in the Second District of La Union by merging the municipalities of Agoo and Aringay. The bill was co-authored by Eriguel's allies, La Union first district Rep. Victor Ortega and Abono party-list Rep. Francisco Emmanuelle Ortega III. The bill would have created the "City of Agoo-Aringay," having two districts under a mayor and vice mayor along with 14 councilors in the Sangguniang Panlungsod, all of which were "new" positions for which the former municipal officials could run despite having finished the terms limits of their offices. The purpose of the bill was to increase the Internal Revenue Allotment (IRA) received by the cities, so they could build more infrastructure, gain various employment and businesses, increase recreational activities, and among other benefits.

During his term Eriguel started festivals and events to solidify Agoo's rich culture and help its economy and tourism. The Dinengdeng festival, which was first celebrated in 2005, has been celebrated continuously to this day. The Kilawen festival, which was an idea he shared with his wife, Sandra Eriguel, was first celebrated on December 28, 2011.

=== Saranay Award ===
In 2013, Eriguel was awarded the Saranay Award for his outstanding service during his time as a mayor and congressman. The Saranay Award is given to those with the “highest degree of excellence in their chosen fields.”

=== Bombing ===
Eriguel's caravan was involved in a bombing incident, believed to be an assassination attempt, on April 30, 2016, in Agoo, La Union. The incident claimed the life of his driver, Jiovannie “Dalmas” Cacayuran and seriously injured eight (8) other individuals including his Aide, Samuel Ofiaza who lost his right eye.

=== Temporary inclusion in President Duterte's narco-politicians list ===
On August 16, 2016, Eriguel was included by Philippine President Rodrigo Duterte as one of the local government officials and legislators allegedly involved in illegal drug trade in his "I am sorry for my country" speech. Eriguel and other La Union politicians denied these allegations. In the last part of March 2017, Eriguel and three other La Union politicians were removed from the narco-politician list. A news report quoted sources saying that the inclusion of Eriguel in the narco-politician list was politically motivated. The reporter said there were several personalities close to those in charge of providing the list to the President who have taken advantage of the situation to include the names of their rival politicians.

On June 17, 2018, Eriguel, who had been a founding force in former Vice President Jejomar Binay's United Nationalist Alliance, was sworn into the ruling PDP–Laban party by Speaker Pantaleon Alvarez.

== Death ==
On May 12, 2018, Eriguel and two others were gunned down by unknown assailants in an ambush during an event for the 2018 Barangay elections.

In 2019, May 12 was declared “Eriguel Day” by the Sangguniang Panlalawigan (Provincial Board) of La Union. This serves to commemorate Eriguel, his life and work for Agoo, as well as his sacrifice as it is celebrated on the anniversary of his death.

According to Eriguel's family, the ones responsible for his assassination are still at large.

== See also ==
- Rodrigo Duterte's August 7, 2016, speech
- List of political families in the Philippines
- Agoo
- La Union
