= Eric Singson =

Filipino businessman and politician (1948)

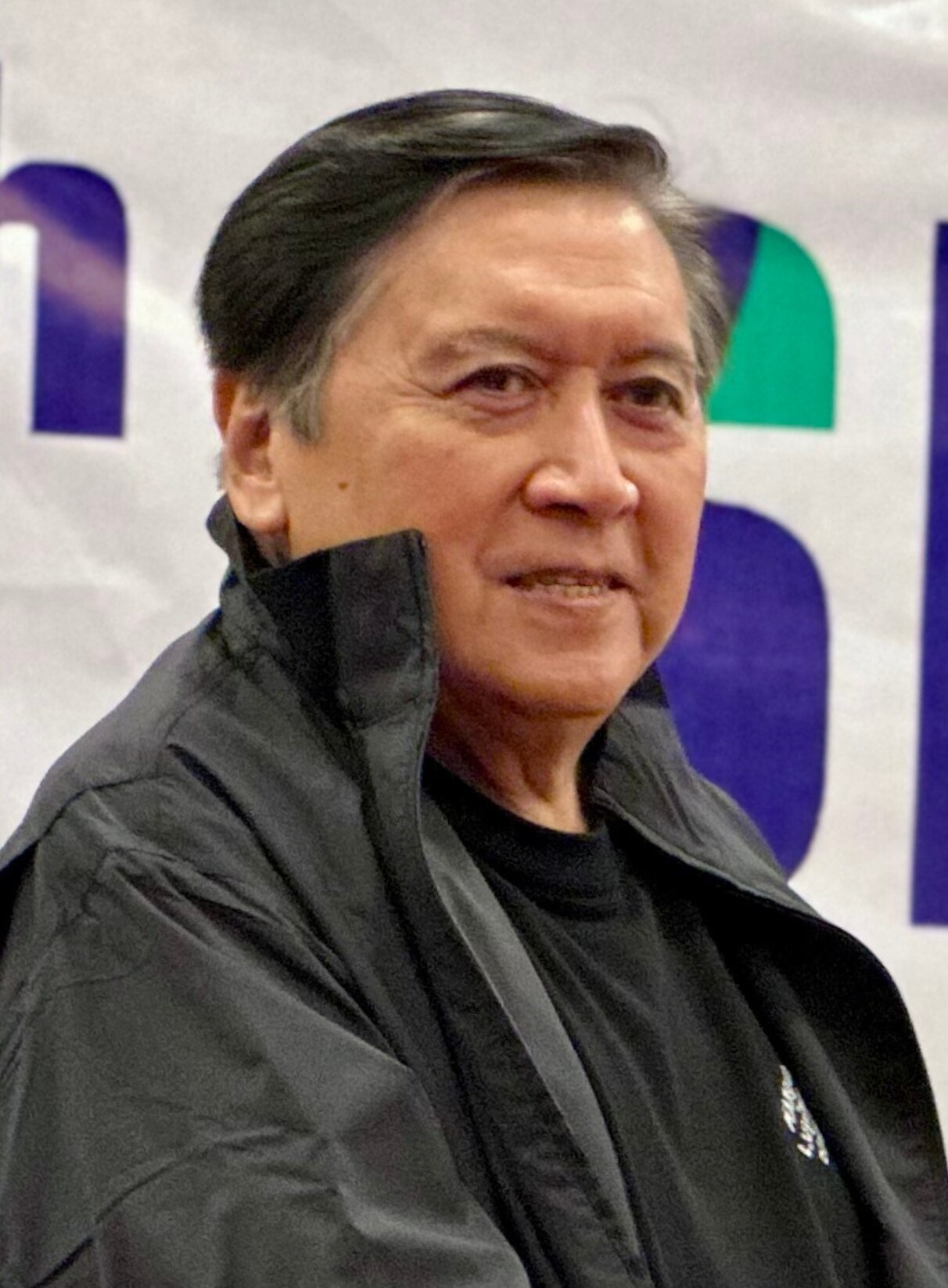
- Singson in 2025

Deputy Speaker of the House of Representatives of the Philippines
- In office July 25, 2016 – June 30, 2019
- House Speaker: Pantaleon Alvarez (2016–2018); Gloria Macapagal Arroyo (2018–2019)
- In office February 21, 2006 – June 30, 2007
- House Speaker: Jose de Venecia Jr.

Member of the Philippine House Representatives from Ilocos Sur's 2nd District
- In office June 30, 2013 – June 30, 2019
- Preceded by: Eric Singson Jr.
- Succeeded by: Kristine Singson-Meehan
- In office June 30, 2001 – June 30, 2010
- Preceded by: Grace Singson
- Succeeded by: Eric Singson Jr.
- In office June 30, 1987 – June 30, 1998
- Preceded by: Lucas Cauton
- Succeeded by: Grace Singson

Member of the Philippine Regular Batasang Pambansa from Ilocos Sur's Lone District
- In office July 23, 1984 – March 25, 1986 Serving with Salacnib Baterina
- Preceded by: Position established
- Succeeded by: Position dissolved

Mayor of Candon
- Incumbent
- Assumed office June 30, 2022
- Vice Mayor: Kristelle Singson
- Preceded by: Ericson Singson
- In office December 30, 1971 – December 30, 1975
- Vice Mayor: Jose Ramos
- Preceded by: Roberto Ma. Guirnalda

Personal details
- Born: June 15, 1948 (age 78) Candon, Ilocos Sur, Philippines
- Party: NPC (2019–present); Bileg (local party; 2018–present)
- Other political affiliations: See list: Lakas–CMD (2006–2010); Lakas–NUCD–UMDP (1995–2000); LDP (1992–1995); Independent (1986–1992; 2010–2012); KBL (1978–1986); Liberal (1971–1978; 2000–2006; 2012–2018)
- Spouse: Grace Gacula
- Children: 5 (inc. Eric Jr., Ericson and Kristine)
- Relatives: Chavit Singson (first cousin)
- Occupation: Businessman, politician

Eric Dario Singson Sr. (born June 15, 1948) is a Filipino businessman and politician from the province of Ilocos Sur. He served Ilocos Sur's 2nd District from June 30, 1987, until June 30, 1998, and again from June 30, 2001, until June 30, 2010, and lastly from June 30, 2013, until June 30, 2019.
