= Dante Garcia =

Filipino politician (born 1971)

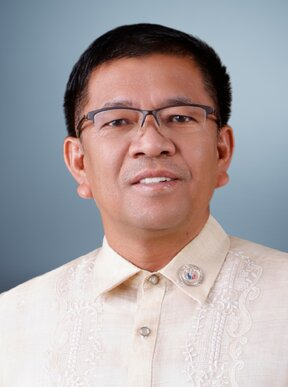
- Official portrait, 2025

Member of the House of Representatives from La Union’s 2nd District
- Incumbent
- Assumed office June 30, 2022
- Preceded by: Sandra Eriguel

Mayor of Tubao
- In office June 30, 2016 – June 30, 2019
- Vice Mayor: Jonalyn Fontanilla
- Preceded by: Jonalyn Fontanilla
- Succeeded by: Jonalyn Fontanilla
- In office June 30, 2004 – June 30, 2013
- Vice Mayor: Lazaro Gayo (2004–2007); Wilfredo Garcia (2007–2013)
- Preceded by: Violeta Verceles
- Succeeded by: Jonalyn Fontanilla

Vice Mayor of Tubao
- In office June 30, 2013 – June 30, 2016
- Mayor: Jonalyn Fontanilla
- Preceded by: Wilfredo Garcia
- Succeeded by: Jonalyn Fontanilla

Personal details
- Born: Dante Sotelo Garcia; November 22, 1971 (age 54) Tubao, La Union, Philippines
- Party: Lakas (2024–present)
- Other political affiliations: PRP (2021–2024); PFP (2018–2021); Independent (2015–2018); NPC (2009–2015); KAMPI (2007–2009); LDP (2004–2007)
- Occupation: Politician

Dante "Dan" Sotelo Garcia (born November 22, 1971) is a Filipino politician. He is currently serving as representative of the 2nd District of La Union in the House of Representatives of the Philippines since 2022. He served as mayor of Tubao from 2016 to 2019, a position he previously held from 2004 to 2013. He also served as vice mayor of Tubao from 2013 to 2016.

== Early life ==
Garcia was born on November 22, 1971, in Tubao, to Francisco Farro Garcia and Aniceta Soriano Sotelo.

== Political career ==
In 2004, Garcia entered politics where he served for three consecutive terms as mayor of Tubao.

In 2013, Garcia became a vice mayor of Tubao until 2016.

In 2016, Garcia returned as mayor of Tubao until 2019.

In 2019, Garcia ran as representative of the second district of La Union but he lost to Sandra Eriguel.

In 2022, Garcia was elected as representative of the second district of Union after he beat Sandra Eriguel over 20,624 votes.

== Personal life ==
Garcia is married to Arlyn M. Garcia.

== Electoral history ==
=== 2025 ===
Candidate	Party	Votes	%
Dante Garcia (incumbent)	Lakas–CMD	212,781	81.29
Francisco Ortega III	Nationalist People's Coalition	47,877	18.29
Joel Fontanilla	Independent	1,105	0.42
Total		261,763	100.00
Valid votes		261,763	97.06
Invalid/blank votes		7,917	2.94
Total votes		269,680	100.00
Registered voters/turnout		308,690	87.36
Lakas–CMD hold			
Source: Commission on Elections

=== 2022 ===
2022 Philippine House of Representatives elections
Party	Candidate	Votes	%
PRP	Dante Garcia	134,938	54.14
Lakas	Sandra Eriguel (incumbent)	114,314	45.86
Total votes		249,252	100.00
PRP gain from Lakas			

=== 2019 ===
2019 Philippine House of Representatives elections
Party	Candidate	Votes	%
PDP–Laban	Sandra Eriguel (incumbent)	120,901	
PFP	Dante Garcia	68,142	
KDP	Tomas Dumpit Sr.	24,881	
Independent	Teddy Agaceta	781	
Total votes			
PDP–Laban hold			

=== 2016 ===
2016 Tubao, La Union mayoralty election
Party	Candidate	Votes	%
Independent	Dante Garcia	13,175	
Total votes			
Independent hold			
