= Sandra Eriguel =

Filipina physician and politician

The Honorable Sandra Eriguel

Member of the Philippine House of Representatives from La Union's 2nd District
- In office June 30, 2016 – June 30, 2022
- Preceded by: Eufranio Eriguel
- Succeeded by: Dante Garcia

Mayor of Agoo
- In office June 30, 2010 – June 30, 2016
- Vice Mayor: Jaime Boado Jr.; Henry Balbin
- Preceded by: Ma. Theresa Dumpit–Michelena
- Succeeded by: Stefanie Ann Eriguel
- In office June 30, 2007 – December 16, 2007
- Vice Mayor: Jaime Boado Jr.
- Preceded by: Eufranio Eriguel
- Succeeded by: Ma. Theresa Dumpit–Michelena

Personal details
- Born: Sandra Young; 23 October 1961 (age 64) Agoo, La Union, Philippines
- Party: NPC (2007–2009; 2012–2016; 2024–present)
- Other political affiliations: Lakas (2021–2024); NUP (2020–2021); PDP–Laban (2016–2020); Independent (2009–2012)
- Spouse: Eufranio Eriguel (died 2018)
- Children: Stefanie Ann Eriguel
- Parents: Ronaldo Young (father); Virginia Young (mother)
- Education: University of the Philippines College of Medicine
- Occupation: Politician
- Profession: Physician

Sandra Young Eriguel (born Sandra Young, 23 October 1961) is a Filipina physician and politician who served as Member of the Philippine House of Representatives from La Union's 2nd District from June 30, 2016, until June 30, 2022.

== Early life ==
Eriguel was born on October 23, 1961 in Agoo, La Union to Dr. Ronaldo Young and Mrs. Virginia Young.

Eriguel grew up and studied in Agoo, La Union. Sandra studied in the University of the Philippines College of Medicine and later graduated and became a licensed medical doctor.

== Political career ==
=== Mayor of Agoo ===
==== First term (June 30 – December 16, 2007) ====
Eriguel run for Mayor of Agoo in 2007 Agoo local election to succeed her husband Eufranio Eriguel who was term-limited. Eriguel later won as Mayor getting 11,803 votes gain to 7,899 votes of Ma. Theresa Dumpit–Michelena.

==== Second term (June 30, 2010 – June 30, 2013) ====
In 2010 Agoo local election, Eriguel run again for Mayor of Agoo to get her position after she unseated and replaced by Ma. Theresa Dumpit–Michelena. Eriguel later won again to Dumpit–Michilena and 2 others via landslide victory.

==== Third term (June 30, 2013 – June 30, 2016) ====
In 2013 Agoo local election, Eriguel run for her second term for Mayor. Eriguel later won garnering 17,595 votes out of 7,384 of Army Major General Mario Chan.

=== Member, House of Representatives ===
==== First term (June 30, 2016 – June 30, 2019) ====
In 2016 Philippine House elections she run for Congresswoman of the 2nd Disteict of La Union to replace her husband who is in his second term. Eriguel later won 150,020 votes out of 40,201 of Thomas Dumpit.

For her first term to the House of Representatives she authored more than 99 House Bill's and House Resolution's.

Eriguel also became as Chairperson of House Committee on Social Services from November 21, 2016, until June 30, 2019.

==== Second term (June 30, 2019 – June 30, 2022) ====
In 2019 House elections she run for reelection and for the second time she won again to her reelection bid. She got 120,901 votes winning via landslide out of 68,142 of Dante Garcia, 24,881 of Thomas Dumpit, Sr., and 781 of Teddy Agaceta.

Eriguel was authored almost 157 House Bills and House Resolution's.

Eriguel also served as Chairperson of House Committee on Inter-Parliamentary Relations and Diplomacy from December 7, 2020, until June 30, 2022.

==== Third term election bid ====
In 2022 Philippine House elections, Eriguel filed her COC (Certificate of Candidacy) under the Lakas–CMD for her third and final term, but later lost to her 2019 election rival Dante Garcia via slim margin.

== Personal life ==
Eriguel married to a businessman and doctor Eufranio Eriguel and have one daughter named Stefanie Ann who later served as Mayor of Agoo.

On July 10, 2021, a plot to assassinate Eriguel was uncovered by police in Agoo. The main suspect was the notorious gun-for-hire-squad allegedly led by retired PCol. Winston Magpali, the same group suspected of killing her husband Eufranio Eriguel in 2018.

== See also ==
- Eufranio Eriguel
- Agoo
- La Union
- Philippine House of Representatives
