= La Union's 2nd congressional district =

Legislative district of the Philippines

- Constituency for the House of Representatives of the Philippines
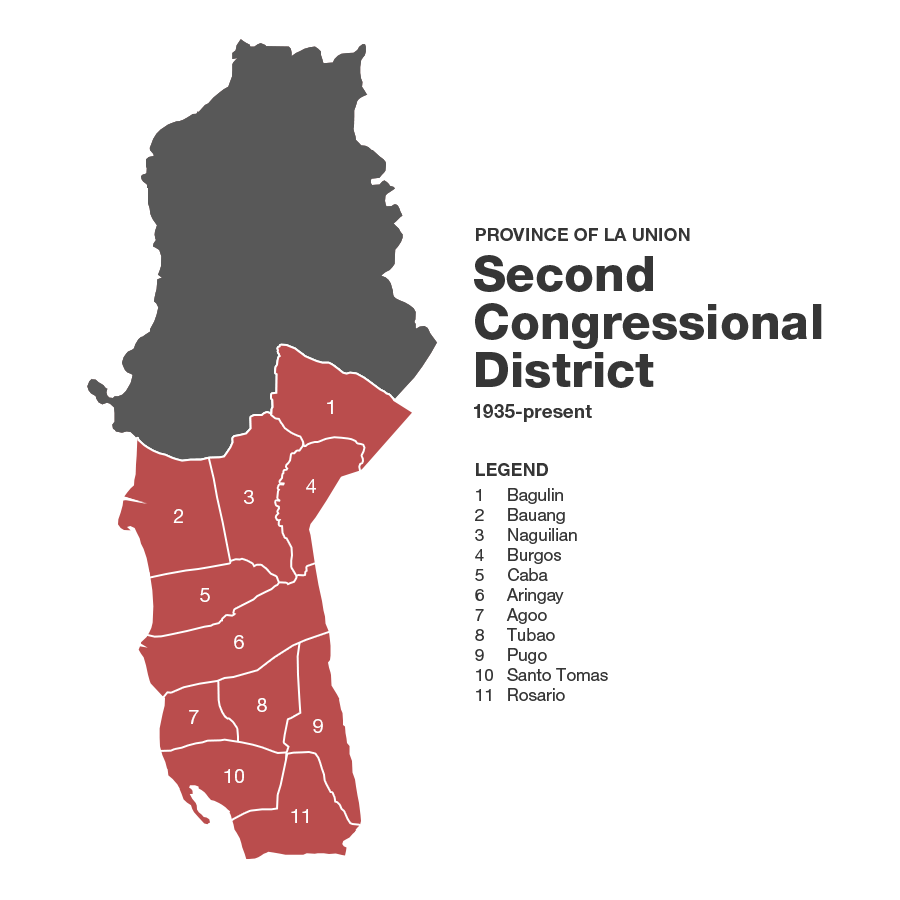
- Boundary of La Union's 2nd congressional district in La Union

- Location of La Union within the Philippines
- Province: La Union
- Region: Ilocos Region
- Population: 445,823 (2020)
- Electorate: 308,690 (2025)
- Major settlements: 11 LGUs: Municipalities; Agoo; Aringay; Bagulin; Bauang; Burgos; Caba; Naguilian; Pugo; Rosario; Santo Tomas; Tubao
- Area: 791.14 km^{2} (305.46 sq mi)

Current constituency
- Created: 1907
- Representative: Dante S. Garcia
- Political party: Lakas–CMD
- Congressional bloc: Majority

La Union's 2nd congressional district is one of the two congressional districts of the Philippines in the province of La Union. It has been represented in the House of Representatives of the Philippines since 1916 and earlier in the Philippine Assembly from 1907 to 1916. The district consists of the southern municipalities of Agoo, Aringay, Bagulin, Bauang, Burgos, Caba, Naguilian, Pugo, Rosario, Santo Tomas and Tubao. It is currently represented in the 20th Congress by Dante S. Garcia of the Lakas–CMD.

== Representation history ==
#	Image	Member	Term of office		Legislature	Party	Electoral history	Constituent LGUs
#	Image	Member	Start	End	Legislature	Party	Electoral history	Constituent LGUs
=== La Union's 2nd district for the Philippine Assembly ===
District created January 9, 1907.
1		Francisco Zandueta	October 16, 1907	October 16, 1909	1st	Progresista	Elected in 1907.	1907–1916; Agoo, Aringay, Bauang, Caba, Naguilian, Rosario, Santo Tomas, Tubao
2		Anacleto Díaz	October 16, 1909	October 16, 1912	2nd	Nacionalista	Elected in 1909.	1907–1916; Agoo, Aringay, Bauang, Caba, Naguilian, Rosario, Santo Tomas, Tubao
3		Florencio Baltazar	October 16, 1912	October 16, 1916	3rd	Progresista	Elected in 1912.	1907–1916; Agoo, Aringay, Bauang, Caba, Naguilian, Rosario, Santo Tomas, Tubao
=== La Union's 2nd district for the House of Representatives of the Philippine Islands ===
4		Valerio M. Fontanilla	October 16, 1916	June 3, 1919	4th	Independent	Elected in 1916.	1916–1935; Agoo, Aringay, Bauang, Caba, Naguilian, Rosario, Santo Tomas, Tubao
5		Felipe C. Díaz	June 3, 1919	June 6, 1922	5th	Nacionalista	Elected in 1919.	1916–1935; Agoo, Aringay, Bauang, Caba, Naguilian, Rosario, Santo Tomas, Tubao
6		Mauro Ortíz	June 6, 1922	June 2, 1925	6th	Nacionalista; Colectivista	Elected in 1922.	1916–1935; Agoo, Aringay, Bauang, Caba, Naguilian, Rosario, Santo Tomas, Tubao
7		Leoncio Dacanay	June 2, 1925	June 5, 1928	7th	Nacionalista; Consolidado	Elected in 1925.	1916–1935; Agoo, Aringay, Bauang, Caba, Naguilian, Rosario, Santo Tomas, Tubao
8		Mariano Villanueva	June 5, 1928	June 2, 1931	8th	Independent	Elected in 1928.	1916–1935; Agoo, Aringay, Bauang, Caba, Naguilian, Rosario, Santo Tomas, Tubao
9		Rodolfo Baltazar	June 2, 1931	June 5, 1934	9th	Nacionalista; Consolidado	Elected in 1931.	1916–1935; Agoo, Aringay, Bauang, Caba, Naguilian, Rosario, Santo Tomas, Tubao
10		Enrique Rimando	June 5, 1934	September 16, 1935	10th	Nacionalista; Democrático	Elected in 1934.	1916–1935; Agoo, Aringay, Bauang, Caba, Naguilian, Rosario, Santo Tomas, Tubao
#	Image	Member	Term of office		National Assembly	Party	Electoral history	Constituent LGUs
#	Image	Member	Start	End	National Assembly	Party	Electoral history	Constituent LGUs
=== La Union's 2nd district for the National Assembly (Commonwealth of the Philippines) ===
11		Agatón R. Yaranon	September 16, 1935	December 30, 1938	1st	Nacionalista; Democrático	Elected in 1935.	1935–1941; Agoo, Aringay, Bagulin, Bauang, Burgos, Caba, Naguilian, Pugo, Rosario, Santo Tomas, Tubao
12		Eulogio F. de Guzmán Sr.	December 30, 1938	December 30, 1941	2nd	Nacionalista	Elected in 1938.	1935–1941; Agoo, Aringay, Bagulin, Bauang, Burgos, Caba, Naguilian, Pugo, Rosario, Santo Tomas, Tubao
District dissolved into the two-seat La Union's at-large district for the National Assembly (Second Philippine Republic).
#	Image	Member	Term of office		Common wealth Congress	Party	Electoral history	Constituent LGUs
#	Image	Member	Start	End	Common wealth Congress	Party	Electoral history	Constituent LGUs
=== La Union's 2nd district for the House of Representatives of the Commonwealth of the Philippines ===
District re-created May 24, 1945.
(10)		Enrique Rimando	June 11, 1945	May 25, 1946	1st	Nacionalista	Elected in 1941.	1945–1946; Agoo, Aringay, Bagulin, Bauang, Burgos, Caba, Naguilian, Pugo, Rosario, Santo Tomas, Tubao
#	Image	Member	Term of office		Congress	Party	Electoral history	Constituent LGUs
#	Image	Member	Start	End	Congress	Party	Electoral history	Constituent LGUs
=== La Union's 2nd district for the House of Representatives of the Philippines ===
13		Manuel T. Cases	May 25, 1946	December 30, 1965	1st	Liberal	Elected in 1946.	1946–1972; Agoo, Aringay, Bagulin, Bauang, Burgos, Caba, Naguilian, Pugo, Rosario, Santo Tomas, Tubao
13		Manuel T. Cases	May 25, 1946	December 30, 1965	2nd	Liberal	Re-elected in 1949.	1946–1972; Agoo, Aringay, Bagulin, Bauang, Burgos, Caba, Naguilian, Pugo, Rosario, Santo Tomas, Tubao
13		Manuel T. Cases	May 25, 1946	December 30, 1965	3rd	Liberal	Re-elected in 1953.	1946–1972; Agoo, Aringay, Bagulin, Bauang, Burgos, Caba, Naguilian, Pugo, Rosario, Santo Tomas, Tubao
13		Manuel T. Cases	May 25, 1946	December 30, 1965	4th	Liberal	Re-elected in 1957.	1946–1972; Agoo, Aringay, Bagulin, Bauang, Burgos, Caba, Naguilian, Pugo, Rosario, Santo Tomas, Tubao
13		Manuel T. Cases	May 25, 1946	December 30, 1965	5th	Liberal	Re-elected in 1961.	1946–1972; Agoo, Aringay, Bagulin, Bauang, Burgos, Caba, Naguilian, Pugo, Rosario, Santo Tomas, Tubao
14		Epifanio B. Castillejos	December 30, 1965	December 30, 1969	6th	Nacionalista	Elected in 1965.	1946–1972; Agoo, Aringay, Bagulin, Bauang, Burgos, Caba, Naguilian, Pugo, Rosario, Santo Tomas, Tubao
15		José Aspiras	December 30, 1969	September 23, 1972	7th	Nacionalista	Elected in 1969. Removed from office after imposition of martial law.	1946–1972; Agoo, Aringay, Bagulin, Bauang, Burgos, Caba, Naguilian, Pugo, Rosario, Santo Tomas, Tubao
District dissolved into the twelve-seat Region I's at-large district for the Interim Batasang Pambansa, followed by the two-seat La Union's at-large district for the Regular Batasang Pambansa.
District re-created February 2, 1987.
(15)		José Aspiras	June 30, 1987	June 30, 1998	8th	Independent	Elected in 1987.	1987–present Agoo, Aringay, Bagulin, Bauang, Burgos, Caba, Naguilian, Pugo, Rosario, Santo Tomas, Tubao
(15)		José Aspiras	June 30, 1987	June 30, 1998	9th	NPC (Bileg ti La Union)	Re-elected in 1992.	1987–present Agoo, Aringay, Bagulin, Bauang, Burgos, Caba, Naguilian, Pugo, Rosario, Santo Tomas, Tubao
(15)		José Aspiras	June 30, 1987	June 30, 1998	10th	Lakas (Bileg ti La Union)	Re-elected in 1995.	1987–present Agoo, Aringay, Bagulin, Bauang, Burgos, Caba, Naguilian, Pugo, Rosario, Santo Tomas, Tubao
16		Tomas M. Dumpit	June 30, 1998	June 30, 2007	11th	NPC	Elected in 1998.	1987–present Agoo, Aringay, Bagulin, Bauang, Burgos, Caba, Naguilian, Pugo, Rosario, Santo Tomas, Tubao
16		Tomas M. Dumpit	June 30, 1998	June 30, 2007	12th	NPC	Re-elected in 2001.	1987–present Agoo, Aringay, Bagulin, Bauang, Burgos, Caba, Naguilian, Pugo, Rosario, Santo Tomas, Tubao
16		Tomas M. Dumpit	June 30, 1998	June 30, 2007	13th	KAMPI	Re-elected in 2004.	1987–present Agoo, Aringay, Bagulin, Bauang, Burgos, Caba, Naguilian, Pugo, Rosario, Santo Tomas, Tubao
17		Tomas L. Dumpit Jr.	June 30, 2007	June 30, 2010	14th	Lakas	Elected in 2007.	1987–present Agoo, Aringay, Bagulin, Bauang, Burgos, Caba, Naguilian, Pugo, Rosario, Santo Tomas, Tubao
18		Eufranio Eriguel	June 30, 2010	June 30, 2016	15th	NPC	Elected in 2010.	1987–present Agoo, Aringay, Bagulin, Bauang, Burgos, Caba, Naguilian, Pugo, Rosario, Santo Tomas, Tubao
18		Eufranio Eriguel	June 30, 2010	June 30, 2016	16th	NPC	Re-elected in 2013.	1987–present Agoo, Aringay, Bagulin, Bauang, Burgos, Caba, Naguilian, Pugo, Rosario, Santo Tomas, Tubao
19		Sandra Y. Eriguel	June 30, 2016	June 30, 2022	17th	PDP–Laban	Elected in 2016.	1987–present Agoo, Aringay, Bagulin, Bauang, Burgos, Caba, Naguilian, Pugo, Rosario, Santo Tomas, Tubao
19		Sandra Y. Eriguel	June 30, 2016	June 30, 2022	18th	NUP	Re-elected in 2019.	1987–present Agoo, Aringay, Bagulin, Bauang, Burgos, Caba, Naguilian, Pugo, Rosario, Santo Tomas, Tubao
19		Sandra Y. Eriguel	June 30, 2016	June 30, 2022	18th	Lakas	Re-elected in 2019.	1987–present Agoo, Aringay, Bagulin, Bauang, Burgos, Caba, Naguilian, Pugo, Rosario, Santo Tomas, Tubao
20		Dante S. Garcia	June 30, 2022	Incumbent	19th	PRP	Elected in 2022.	1987–present Agoo, Aringay, Bagulin, Bauang, Burgos, Caba, Naguilian, Pugo, Rosario, Santo Tomas, Tubao
20		Dante S. Garcia	June 30, 2022	Incumbent	20th	Lakas	Re-elected in 2025.	1987–present Agoo, Aringay, Bagulin, Bauang, Burgos, Caba, Naguilian, Pugo, Rosario, Santo Tomas, Tubao

== Election results ==
=== 2025 ===
Candidate	Party	Votes	%
Dante Garcia (incumbent)	Lakas–CMD	212,781	81.29
Francisco Ortega III	Nationalist People's Coalition	47,877	18.29
Joel Fontanilla	Independent	1,105	0.42
Total		261,763	100.00
Valid votes		261,763	97.06
Invalid/blank votes		7,917	2.94
Total votes		269,680	100.00
Registered voters/turnout		308,690	87.36
Lakas–CMD hold			
Source: Commission on Elections

=== 2022 ===
2022 Philippine House of Representatives elections
Party	Candidate	Votes	%
PRP	Dante Garcia	134,938	54.14
Lakas	Sandra Eriguel (incumbent)	114,314	45.86
Total votes		249,252	100.00
PRP gain from Lakas			

=== 2019 ===
2019 Philippine House of Representatives elections
Party	Candidate	Votes	%
PDP–Laban	Sandra Eriguel (incumbent)	120,901	
PFP	Dante Garcia	68,142	
KDP	Tomas Dumpit Sr.	24,881	
Independent	Teddy Agaceta	781	
Total votes			
PDP–Laban hold			

=== 2016 ===
2016 Philippine House of Representatives elections
Party	Candidate	Votes	%
NPC	Sandra Eriguel	150,020	
NUP	Thomas Dumpit	40,201	
Margin of victory			
Invalid or blank votes		20,937	
Total votes		211,158	
NPC hold			

=== 2013 ===
2013 Philippine House of Representatives elections
Party	Candidate	Votes	%
NPC	Eufranio Eriguel	145,322	79.20
NUP	Thomas Dumpit	27,037	14.74
Margin of victory		118,285	64.47%
Invalid or blank votes		11,117	6.06
Total votes		183,476	100.00
NPC hold			

=== 2010 ===
2010 Philippine House of Representatives elections
Party	Candidate	Votes	%
NPC	Eufranio Eriguel	121,236	64.61
Lakas–Kampi	Tomas Dumpit Jr.	63,622	33.91
Independent	Jaime Dulay	2,785	1.48
Valid ballots		187,643	97.00
Invalid or blank votes		5,798	3.00
Total votes		193,441	100.00
NPC gain from Lakas–Kampi			

== See also ==
- Legislative districts of La Union
