= Kristine Singson-Meehan =

Filipino politician (born 1973)

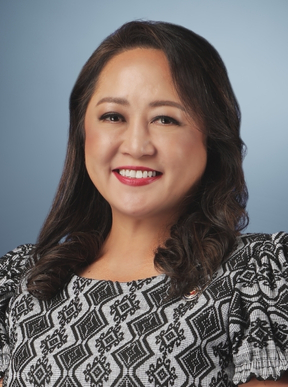
- Official portrait, 2025

Deputy Speaker of the House of Representatives of the Philippines
- In office July 28, 2025 – August 3, 2026
- House Speaker: Martin Romualdez; Faustino "Bojie" Dy III
- In office July 25, 2022 – June 30, 2025
- House Speaker: Martin Romualdez

Member of the Philippine House of Representatives from Ilocos Sur's 2nd district
- Incumbent
- Assumed office June 30, 2019
- Preceded by: Eric Singson

Personal details
- Born: Grace Kristine Gacula Singson; November 21, 1973 (age 52) Mandaluyong, Rizal, Philippines
- Party: NPC (2021–present); Bileg (local party; 2018–present)
- Spouse: Anthony Meehan
- Children: 4
- Parents: Eric Singson (father); Grace Singson (mother)
- Relatives: Chavit Singson (uncle)
- Occupation: Politician

Grace Kristine Gacula Singson-Meehan (born November 21, 1973) is a Filipino politician who has served as the representative for Ilocos Sur's second district since 2019 under Bileg in the 2019 elections and the Nationalist People's Coalition (NPC) from the 2022 elections, succeeding her father Eric Singson. She was one of the House Deputy Speakers from December 7, 2020, until August 3, 2026.

== Early life and career ==
Grace Kristine Singson was born on November 21, 1973, in Mandaluyong, Manila. Meehan is the co-owned of the Baguio-based Le Monet Hotel alongside her husband Anthony. In the 2016 Philippine general election, Meehan was selected as the first nominee for the Association for the Development Dedicated to Agriculture and Fisheries Inc. (ADDA), but failed to enter the House of Representatives as ADDA gained 223,408 votes, missing the top 46 party-lists that gained seats.

== House of Representatives (2019-present) ==
In 2018, Singson, her father and the Incumbent representative of Ilocos Sur's second district, withdrew, with Meehan running instead under Bileg for the 2019 Philippine House of Representatives elections. Her sole opponent was Tagudin councilor Arturo Chua running under PDP–Laban. She won with 158,523 votes against Chua's 18,898. On December 7, 2020, House Speaker Lord Allan Velasco installed Meehan and nine others as House Deputy Speakers. In the 2022 Philippine House of Representatives elections, Meehan ran unopposed under the NPC, securing the seat with 180,555 votes. Meehan voted in favor for the impeachment of Vice President Sara Duterte in February 2025. In the 2025 Philippine House of Representatives elections, Meehan ran under NPC with one opponent: Tagudin Mayor Roque Versoza Jr. running independently. She won again, with 163,262 votes as opposed to Versoza's 76,181. Meehan was elected as one of the nine House Deputy Speakers on July 28, but her tenure ended on August 3, 2026, after Negros Occidental Representative Mercedes Alvarez–Lansang was elected as deputy speaker, replacing Meehan's position.
