= Legislative districts of La Union =

Legislative district of the Philippines

The legislative districts of La Union are the representations of the province of La Union in the various national legislatures of the Philippines. The province is currently represented in the lower house of the Congress of the Philippines through its first and second congressional districts.

== History ==
La Union initially comprised a single district in 1898, when it returned four delegates to the Malolos Congress that lasted until 1899. It was later divided into two congressional districts in 1907.

From 1943 to 1945, in the disruption caused by the Second World War, two delegates represented the province in the National Assembly of the Japanese-sponsored Second Philippine Republic: one was the provincial governor (an ex officio member), while the other was elected through a provincial assembly of KALIBAPI members during the Japanese occupation of the Philippines. Upon the restoration of the Philippine Commonwealth in 1945, the province reverted to its pre-war two-district representation.

The province was represented in the Interim Batasang Pambansa as part of Region IV-A from 1978 to 1984, and returned two representatives, elected at large, to the Regular Batasang Pambansa in 1984. It regained its two congressional districts under the new Constitution which was proclaimed on February 11, 1987, and elected members to the restored House of Representatives starting that same year.

== Current districts ==
La Union's current congressional delegation is composed of two members.

Lakas–CMD (2)

Legislative districts and representatives of La Union
District	Current Representative		Party	Constituent LGUs	Population (2020)	Area	Map
District	Image	Name	Party	Constituent LGUs	Population (2020)	Area	Map
1st		Paolo Ortega (since 2022); City of San Fernando	Lakas–CMD	List: Bacnotan; Balaoan; Bangar; Luna; San Fernando; San Gabriel; San Juan; Santol; Sudipen	376,529	706.56 km²	
2nd		Dante Garcia (since 2022); Tubao	Lakas–CMD	List: Agoo; Aringay; Bagulin; Bauang; Burgos; Caba; Naguilian; Pugo; Rosario; Santo Tomas; Tubao	445,823	791.14 km²	

== Historical districts ==
=== At-large district (defunct) ===
==== 1898–1899 ====
Period	Representatives
Malolos Congress; 1898–1899	Joaquin Luna
Malolos Congress; 1898–1899	Miguel Paterno
Malolos Congress; 1898–1899	Mateo del Rosario

==== 1943–1944 ====
Period	Representative
National Assembly; 1943–1944	Rufino N. Macagba
National Assembly; 1943–1944	Bonifacio Tadiar

==== 1984–1986 ====
Period	Representative
Regular Batasang Pambansa; 1984–1986	Jose D. Aspiras
Regular Batasang Pambansa; 1984–1986	Joaquin L. Ortega

== See also ==
- Legislative district of Mountain Province
