= La Union's at-large congressional district =

Legislative district of the Philippines

La Union's at-large congressional district is an obsolete electoral district that was used for electing members of Philippine national legislatures in La Union before 1987.

La Union first elected its representatives at-large during the 1898 Philippine legislative election for a seat in the Malolos Congress, the National Assembly of the First Philippine Republic, with additional seats granted to two appointed delegates. Following the installation of U.S. civil government in 1901 and the reorganization of provinces for the Philippine Assembly, La Union was divided into a first and second district. The provincewide electoral district was re-created ahead of the 1943 Philippine legislative election for a seat in the National Assembly of the Second Philippine Republic, with an additional seat assigned to its provincial governor. The district became inactive again following the restoration of the House of Representatives in 1945 when La Union returned to electing its representatives from its two districts. In the unicameral Batasang Pambansa that replaced the House in 1978, La Union was included in the multi-member regional electoral district of Region I (Ilocos Region) for its interim parliament. The district was again utilized in the 1984 Philippine parliamentary election when La Union was granted two seats in the regular parliament.

After 1986, La Union elected its representatives from its two single-member congressional districts restored under a new constitution.

== Representation history ==
#	Term of office		National Assembly	Seat A				Seat B				Seat C			
#	Start	End	National Assembly	Image	Member	Party	Electoral history	Image	Member	Party	Electoral history	Image	Member	Party	Electoral history
=== Union's at-large district for the Malolos Congress ===
District created June 18, 1898.
–	September 15, 1898	March 23, 1901	1st		Joaquín Luna	Independent	Elected in 1898.		Miguel Paterno	Independent	Appointed.		Mateo del Rosario	Independent	Appointed.
#	Term of office		National Assembly	Seat A				Seat B							
#	Start	End	National Assembly	Image	Member	Party	Electoral history	Image	Member	Party	Electoral history				
=== La Union's at-large district for the National Assembly (Second Philippine Republic) ===
District re-created September 7, 1943.
–	September 25, 1943	February 2, 1944	1st		Rufino Macagba	KALIBAPI	Elected in 1943.		Bonifacio Tadiar	KALIBAPI	Appointed as an ex officio member.				
District dissolved into La Union's 1st and 2nd districts.
#	Term of office		Batasang Pambansa	Seat A				Seat B							
#	Start	End	Batasang Pambansa	Image	Member	Party	Electoral history	Image	Member	Party	Electoral history				
=== La Union's at-large district for the Regular Batasang Pambansa ===
District re-created February 1, 1984.
–	July 23, 1984	March 25, 1986	2nd		Jose Aspiras	KBL	Elected in 1984.		Joaquin L. Ortega	KBL	Elected in 1984.				
District dissolved into La Union's 1st and 2nd districts.

== See also ==
- Legislative districts of La Union
