= Naguilian, La Union =

Municipality in La Union, Philippines

Naguilian
- Municipality
- Municipality of Naguilian
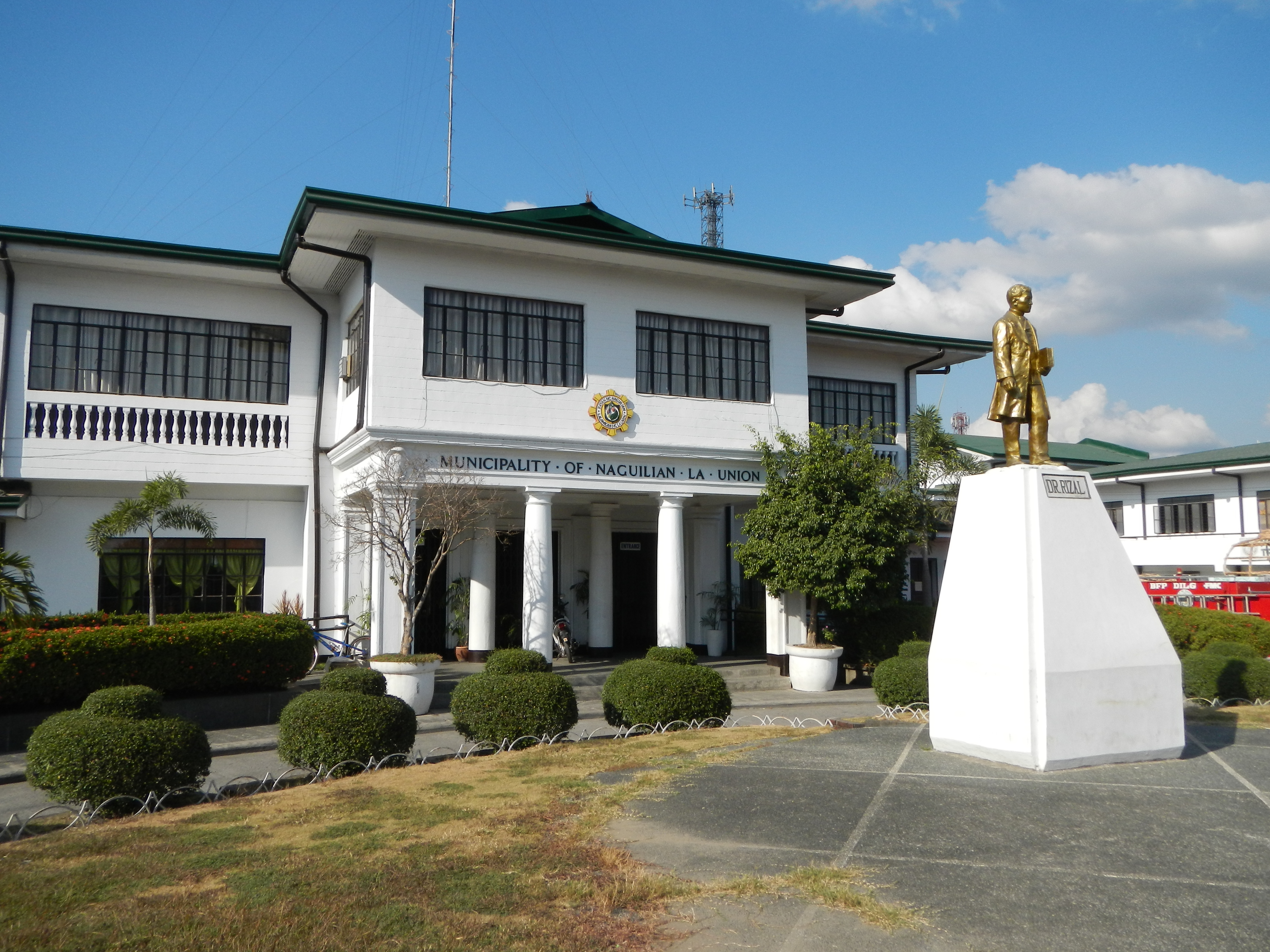
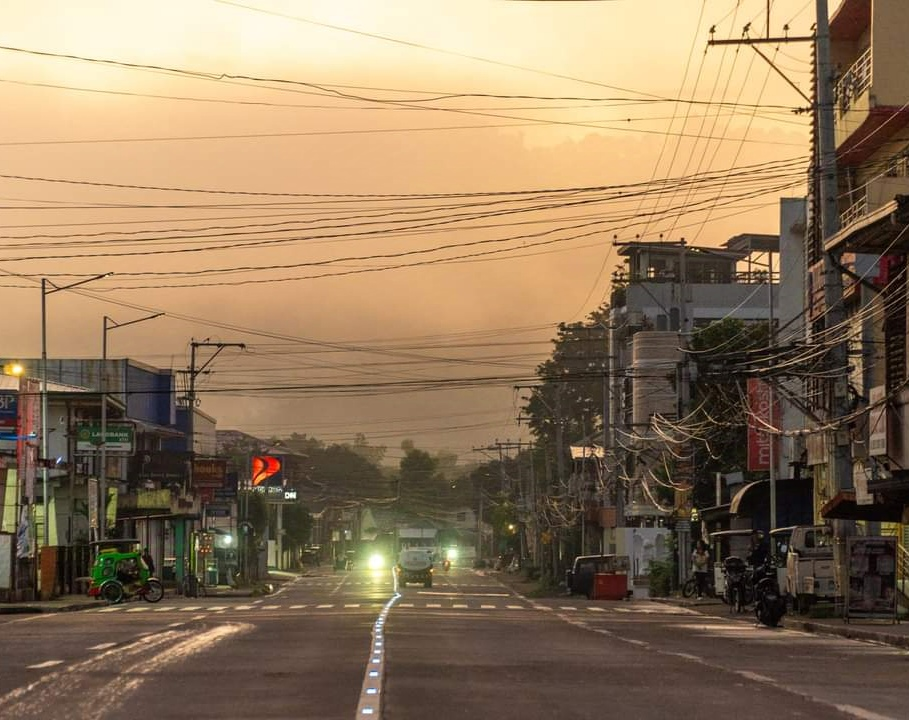
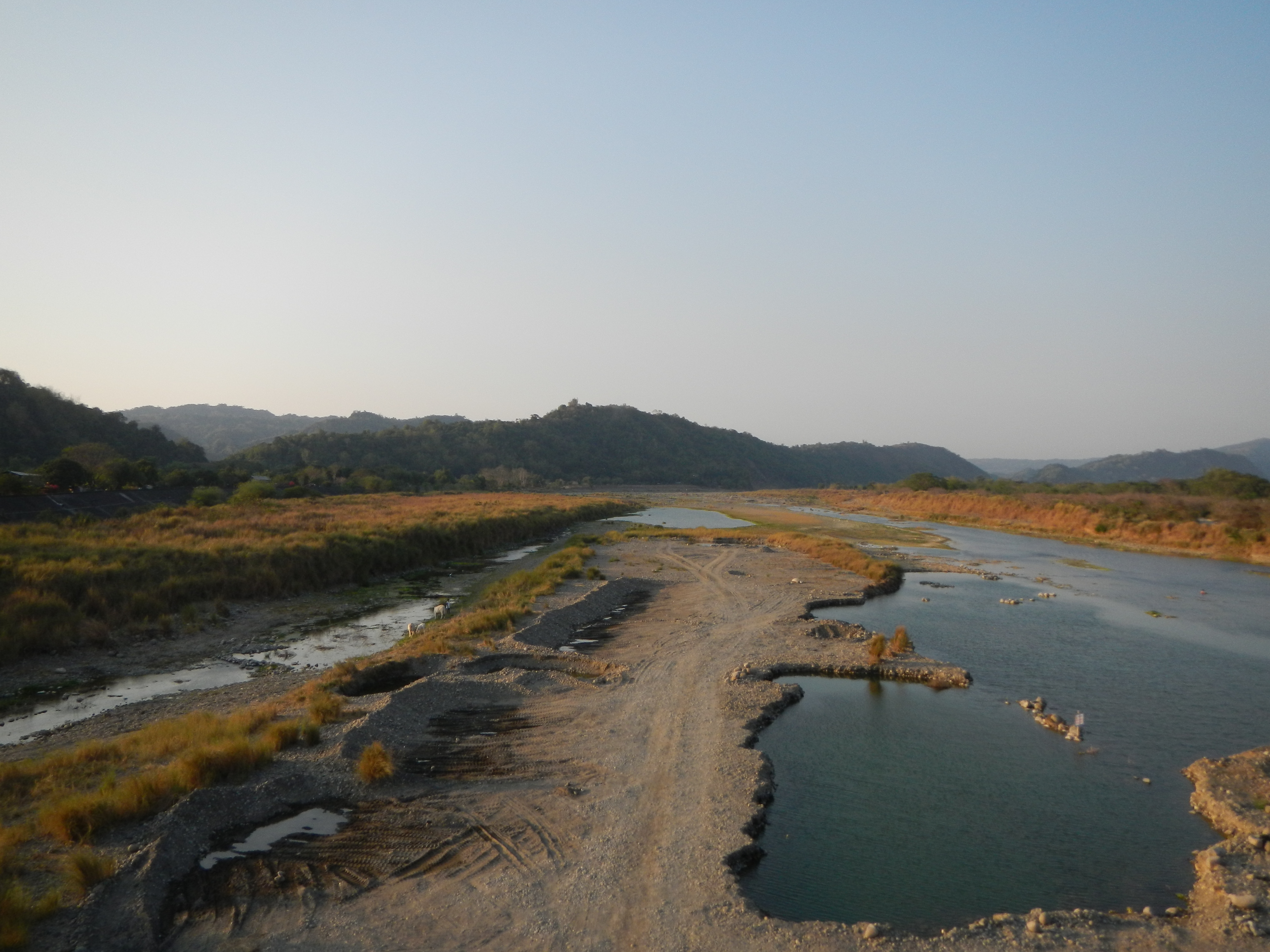
- Naguilian Municipal Hall, Downtown proper and Naguilian or Balili River

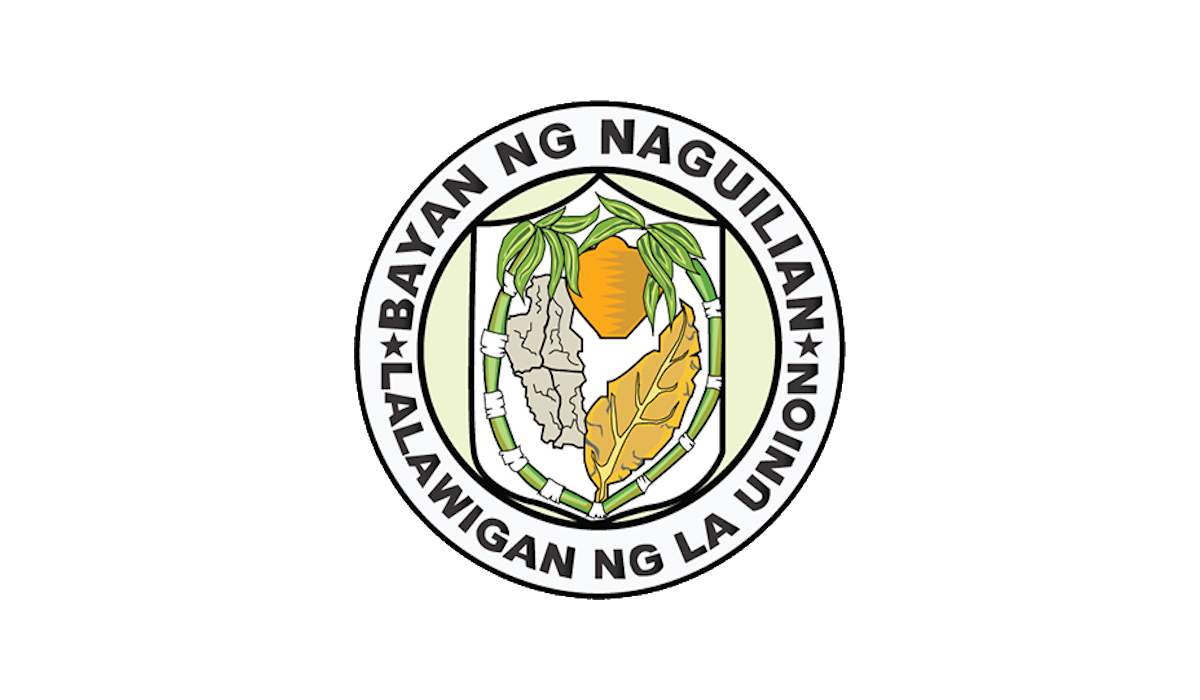
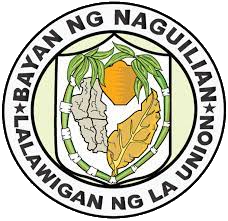
- Flag Seal
- Nicknames: The True Heart of La Union; Home of the Original Basi
- Motto: Tattan Naguilian!
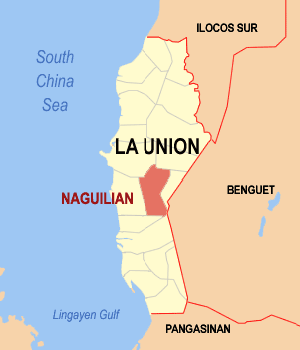
- Map of La Union with Naguilian highlighted
- Interactive map of Naguilian
- Location within the Philippines
- Coordinates: 16°32′N 120°24′E
- Country: Philippines
- Region: Ilocos Region
- Province: La Union
- District: 2nd district
- Founded: February 18, 1839
- Barangays: 37 (see Barangays)

Government
  - Type: Sangguniang Bayan
  - Mayor: Hon. Nieri T. Flores
  - Vice Mayor: Hon. Reynaldo J. Flores
  - Representative: Hon. Dante S. Garcia
  - Municipal Council: Members: Ruperto A. Rillera Jr.; Diomedes F. Hipol; Georgina F. Estepa-Flores; Helen C. Obispo; Danilo T. Soriano; Hulgar Redentor R. Rimando; Aurelio F. Flora; Roger A. Floresca
  - Electorate: 36,646 voters (2025)

Area
  - Total: 104.60 km^{2} (40.39 sq mi)
- Elevation: 95 m (312 ft)
- Highest elevation: 495 m (1,624 ft)
- Lowest elevation: 7 m (23 ft)

Population (2024 census)
  - Total: 53,443
  - Density: 510.93/km^{2} (1,323.3/sq mi)
  - Households: 12,915
- Demonym: Naguilianon

Economy
  - Income class: 1st municipal income class
  - Poverty incidence: 8.12% (2023)
  - Revenue: ▲PHP 307,477,249.26 million (28.02%) (2022)
  - Assets: ▲PHP 1,153,571,103.05 billion (25.73%) (2022)
  - Equity: ▲PHP 947,824,505.09 million (17.71%) (2022)
  - Expenditure: ▲PHP 166,800,843.74 million (20.64%) (2022)
  - Liabilities: ▲PHP 205,746,597.96 million (83.33%) (2022)

Service provider
  - Electricity: La Union Electric Cooperative (LUELCO)
- Time zone: UTC+8 (PST)
- ZIP code: 2511
- PSGC: 0103311000
- IDD : area code: +63 (0)72
- Native languages: Ilocano; Tagalog
- Major religions: Roman Catholic
- Patron saint: Saint Augustine of Hippo
- Notable Festival: Basi Festival
- Website: naguilianlu.gov.ph

Naguilian, officially the Municipality of Naguilian (Ilocano: Ili ti Naguilian; Filipino: Bayan ng Naguilian), is a municipality in the province of La Union, Philippines. According to the 2024 census, it has a population of 53,443 people.

It is renowned as the Home of the Original Basi, a traditional fermented sugarcane wine. Naguilian is located at the geographical center of La Union and has a total land area of 10,086.85 hectares, making it the third-largest among the 19 towns and cities in the province. As of 2020, the town has 36,150 registered voters.

== Etymology ==
The name "Naguilian" is derived from the Iloco word nagilian, which is based on the root íli, meaning "town." The prefix nag- indicates the present or past tense, while the suffix -an expresses a perfective aspect, signifying a completed action or state. Together, nag-ili-an can be interpreted as "towned by people" or "a place that has been established or settled by people."

The name is also thought to originate from the Ilocano phrase Nagilian dagiti gangganaet, which translates to "a place where people from other places come to stay." This highlights the town's historical function as a settlement or gathering point for individuals from other regions. Over time, the name "Naguilian" became associated with the town, reflecting its significance as a center for migration and community formation.

== History ==
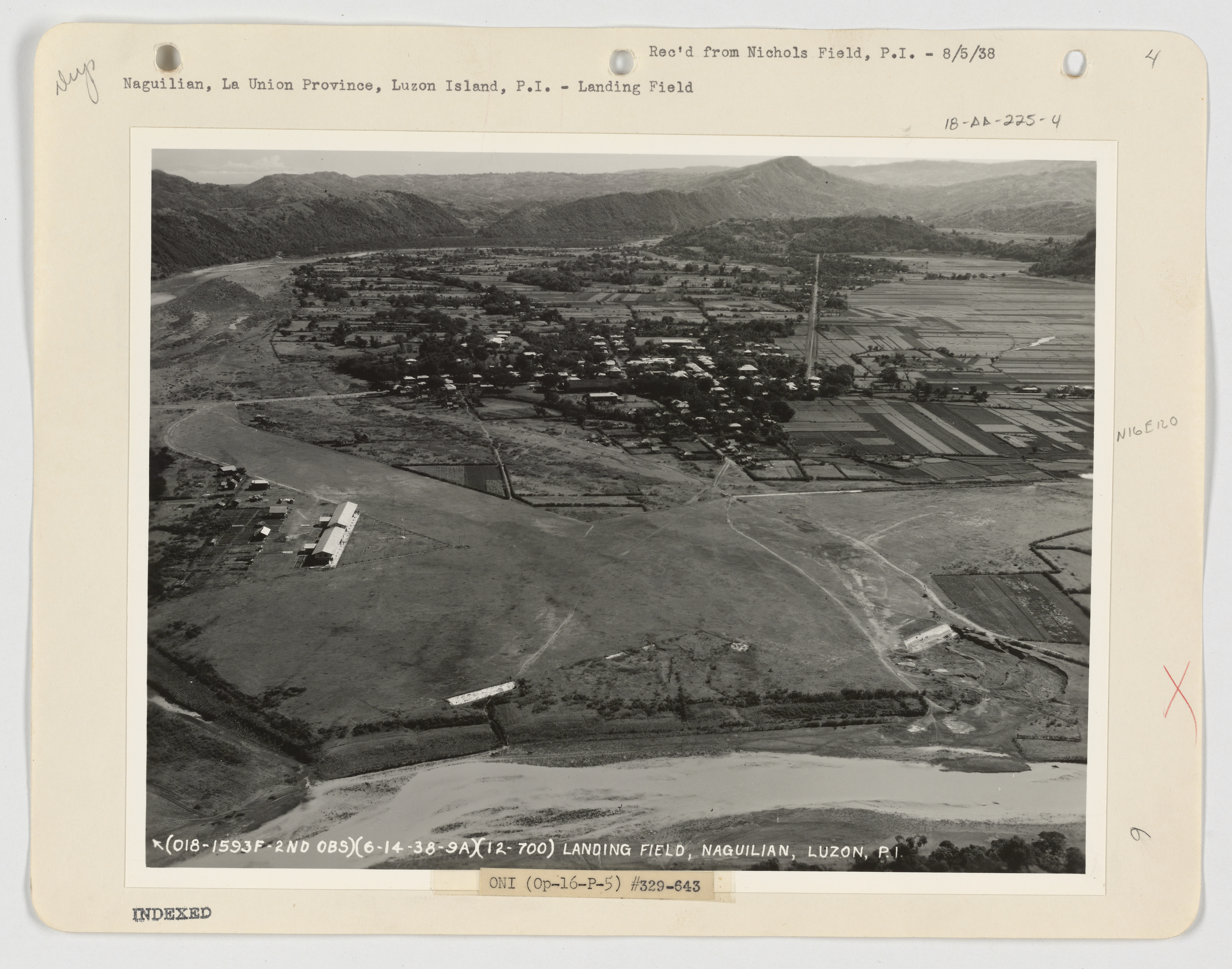
Aerial view of Naguilian, 1938

=== Early history ===
In its early history, Naguilian was originally a settlement of Cordilleran tribes, particularly the Kankanaey and Ibaloi people, who established themselves along the Balili River and the foothills of the Cordillera Central. These early inhabitants engaged in active trade along the Aringay Trail, an ancient gold trading route that connected the southwestern Cordilleras to the lowlands of northwestern Luzon. The settlements traded goods such as gold, silk, textiles, rice, porcelain, wax, and earthenware with neighboring lowland Ilocano (Samtoy) and Pangasinan communities, as well as foreign merchants from China, Japan, and Maritime Southeast Asia.

=== Spanish Colonization ===
During the Spanish colonization in the 1700s, Ilocano immigrants began settling in La Union's coastal areas, including the establishment of the town of Bauang. Due to population growth, settlers followed the river inland and established a colony in a fertile valley they named "Naguilian." They cultivated the land, focusing on agriculture, particularly rice, corn, and sugarcane the primary ingredient in producing traditional wine called "basi" and vinegar. Initially, the settlement was under the jurisdiction of Bauang and governed through the encomienda system, where local inhabitants were entrusted to Spanish encomenderos, friars, and native nobles in exchange for tribute and governance.

By 1739, the Catholic Church in Naguilian was constructed, solidifying the Spanish presence in the area. In 1765, Naguilian, then a barrio of Bauang, became part of the province of Pangasinan and was officially recognized as a town. Don Francisco delos Reyes served as its first gobernadorcillo.

In February 18, 1839, Naguilian separated from Bauang, coinciding with the centennial celebration of its Catholic Church. Portions of Burgos and Bagulin were originally part of Naguilian, including “Disdis” (later called “Stancia” by the Spaniards) and areas along the southwestern bank of the Naguilian River, predominantly inhabited by Igorots.

==== Creation of La Union Province ====
On October 29, 1849, Governor-General Narciso Zaldua Clavería issued a decree unifying eight towns from Pangasinan, three from Ilocos Sur, and territories in the Cordillera to create a new province called La Union. On March 2, 1850, Governor-General Antonio María Blanco signed the Superior Decreto, officially establishing La Union. Naguilian became one of its founding towns, alongside others like San Fernando (the cabicera), Santo Tomas, Rosario, Tubao Agoo, Aringay, Caba, Bauang, San Juan, Balaoan, Luna, Bangar and Bacnotan.

==== Philippine Revolution ====
During the Philippine Revolution, Naguilian residents joined the nationwide struggle for independence from Spain. Under the leadership of General Manuel Tinio y Bondoc, allied with Emilio Aguinaldo, locals fought against Spanish forces in Northern Luzon. Revolutionary leaders from Bauang, such as Remigio Patacsil and Mauro Ortiz, played significant roles in the liberation efforts, which led to the eventual withdrawal of Spanish forces from La Union.

=== American Period ===
During the Philippine-American War, the town became a center of resistance led by Guerrilla Unit No. 1, under the leadership of a certain Captain Rivera. The unit operated in Naguilian and its neighboring areas, including Cava (now Caba) and Galiano (which later became Bagulin and Burgos). These guerrilla efforts were instrumental in resisting American forces and defending the town's autonomy during the conflict.

By the early 1900s, during the American colonial period, the town of Naguilian underwent territorial adjustments. The municipality was divided into three parts: one that remained as Naguilian, another that became part of Burgos, and the third that was incorporated into Bagulin.

=== Japanese Occupation ===
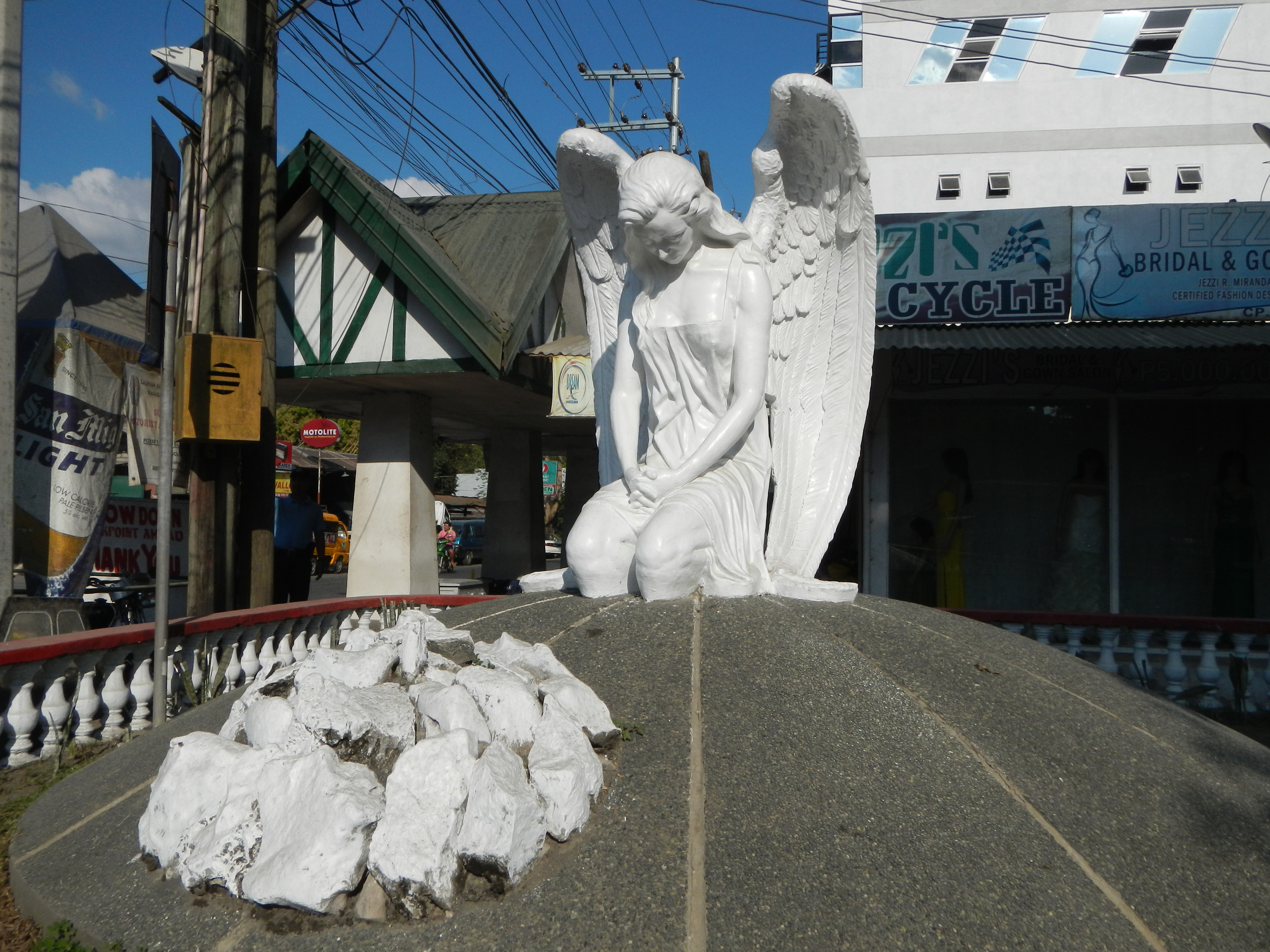
Tomb of the Unknown Soldiers

During the Japanese occupation of the Philippines (1941–1945), Naguilian served as a key route for Japanese soldiers traveling between lowland camps and the Cordillera region, particularly Baguio. The town became a stronghold for guerrilla fighters who resisted Japanese control. Despite strict military rule, forced labor, food shortages, and violence, the people of Naguilian persevered until the liberation of La Union following the Battle of Lingayen Gulf in World War II, which marked the return of American forces.

==== Mangkaeng Massacre ====
On January 23, 1945, the small sitio of Mangkaeng, nestled in the forested hills of Guising Norte, became the site of a massacre, when over 400 residents, who had sought refuge from the advancing Japanese forces, were killed by the rear guard for General Tomoyuki Yamashita, retreating toward the Cordillera mountains as Allied forces pressed on.

== Geography ==
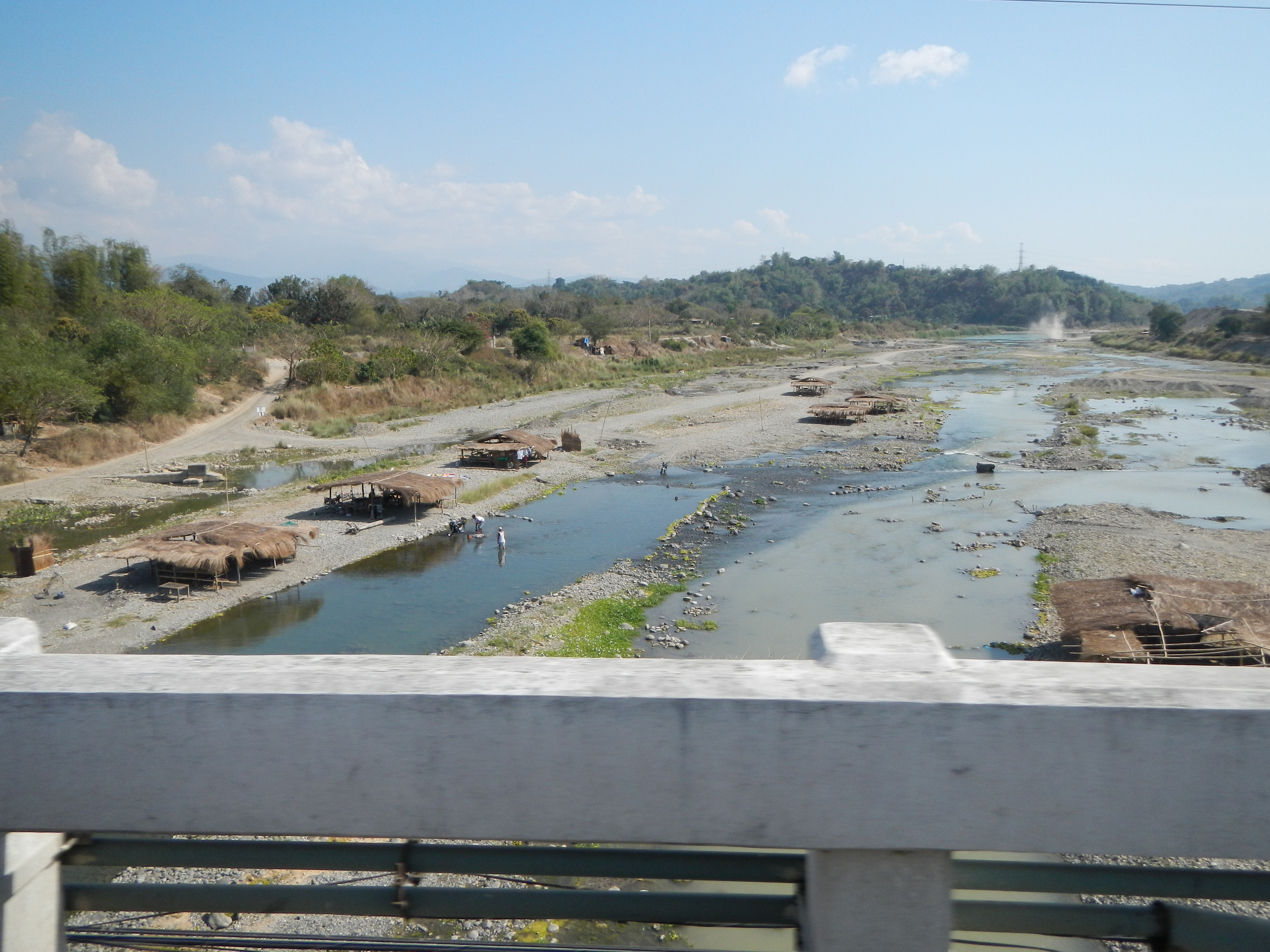
Naguilian River also known as Balili River

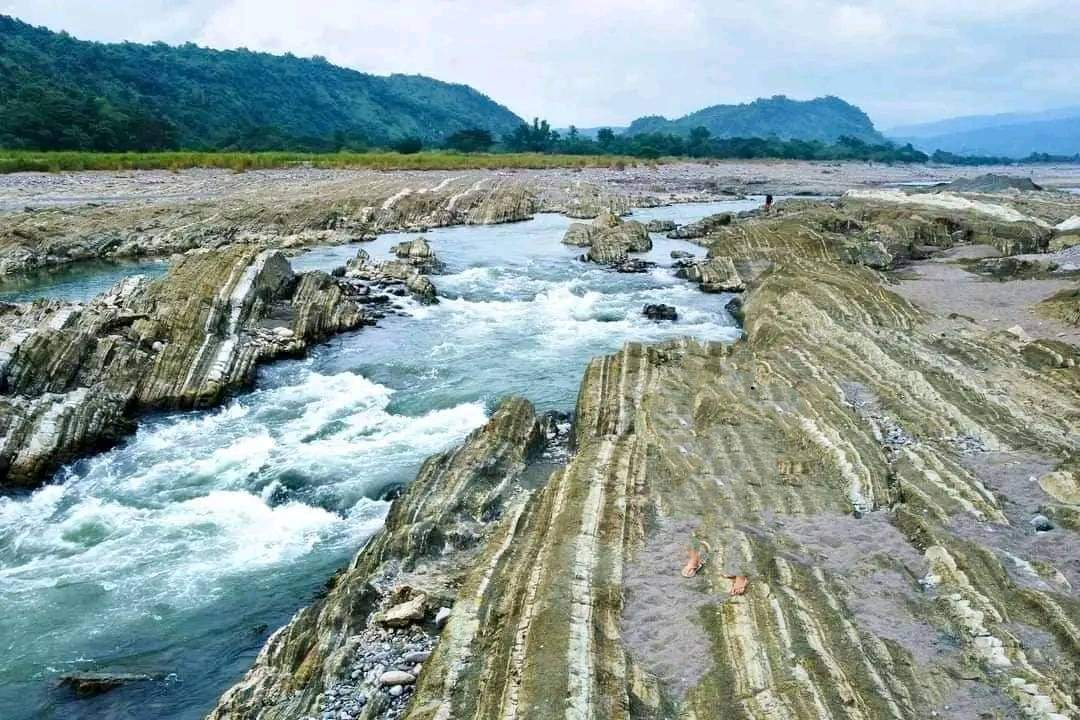
Naguilian (Balili) rock formation

The Municipality of Naguilian is characterized by its gently rolling hills and mountains, bordered by the Cordillera Mountains to the east. The town's landscape features rolling plains in narrow strips framed by mountain slopes and riverbanks, with streams and springs flowing from the mountains. The soil varies from clay loam to sandy loam, with traces of gold in some areas.

The approximate elevation of the municipality is 165 meters above sea level. It has the ninth highest approximate average elevation among the twenty (20) towns of the province. The portion with the highest elevation is 544 meters above sea level while the lowest is 10 meters. The slopes range from 2–7% in barangays like Mamat-ing Sur and Bancagan, 15–25% in areas like Tuddingan and Casilagan, and 0–2% in Lioac Norte and Lioac Sur.

Naguilian is situated 18.48 kilometres (11.48 mi) from the provincial capital San Fernando, and 264.53 kilometres (164.37 mi) from the country's capital city of Manila.

=== Boundaries ===
The Municipality of Naguilian has a total land area of 10,086.85 hectares, making it the third largest among the nineteen towns and cities in the province of La Union. It is situated at the center of La Union and is located at 120°25’ longitude and 16°2’ latitude. Naguilian is bordered to the northwest by City of San Fernando, the capital of La Union; to the northeast by the town of Bagulin; to the east by the town of Burgos; to the southwest by the town of Caba; to the west by the town of Bauang; and, to the southeast by the town of Sablan in the province of Benguet.

Naguilian is 40 kilometres (25 mi) from Baguio via the Naguilian Road, 17 kilometres (11 mi) from the provincial capital, San Fernando, and 266 kilometres (165 mi) from Manila.

=== Land Used ===
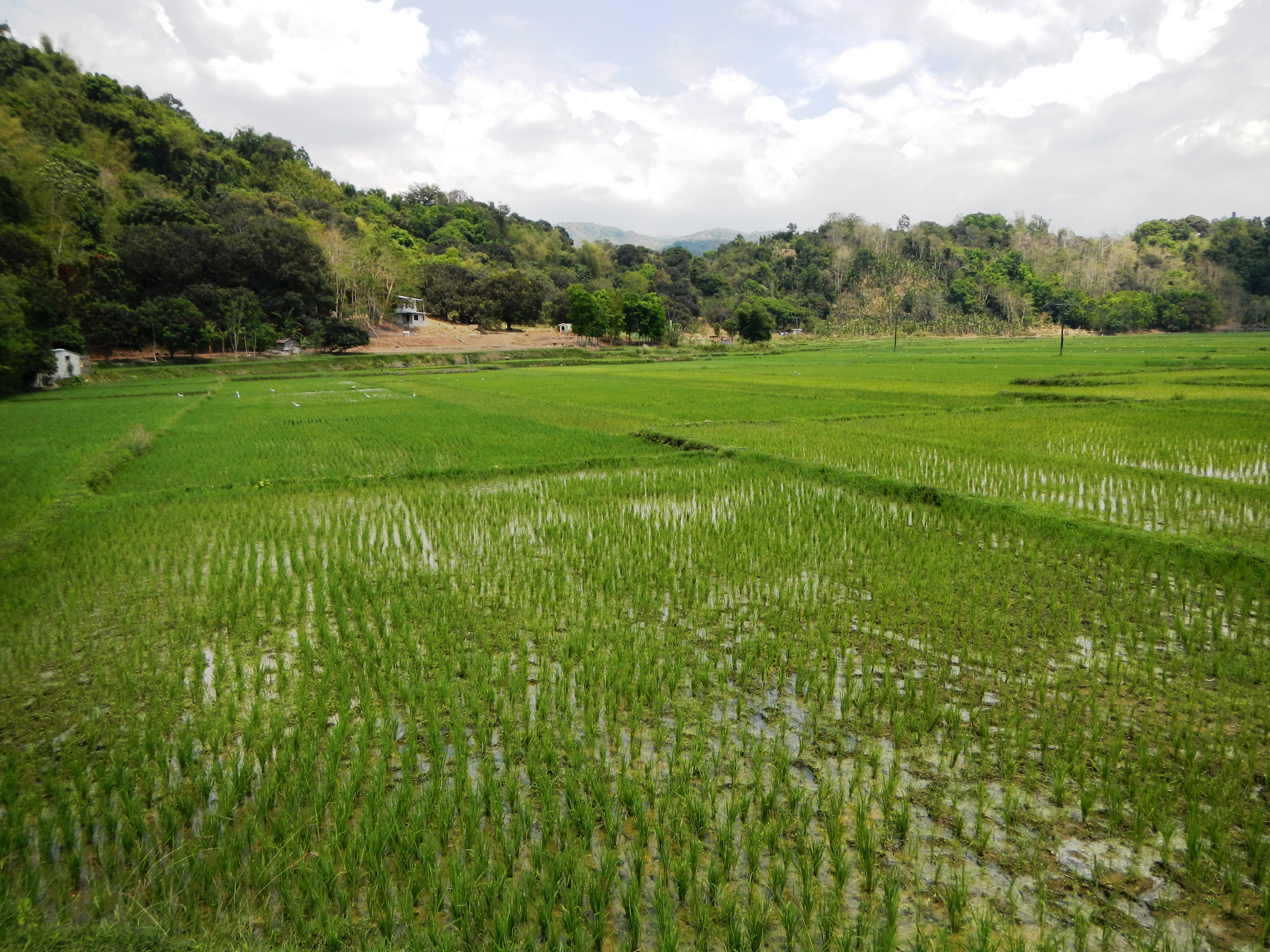
Rice field along Barangay Gusing Sur

The built-up areas of Naguilian are generally spread along barangay roads. Of the total land area, 50 hectares (120 acres), or 0.50%, are classified as built-up areas. Urban built-up areas cover 18.90 hectares (46.7 acres), constituting 11.22% of the total urban land area.

Meanwhile, rural built-up areas total 31.10 hectares (76.8 acres), equivalent to 0.31% of the total rural area. A portion of Barangay Casilagan, with an area of 897.26 hectares (2,217.2 acres), has been designated as a watershed area under Proclamation No. 52 by the Bureau of Forestry. This area accounts for approximately 0.10% of the total land area of Naguilian.

The town has a total of 3,498.80 hectares of wooded land. Among this, 84.41 hectares are classified as open forest, while 363.91 hectares are considered unclassified public forest. The Naguilian Watershed Forest Reserve covers 89.96 hectares. Additionally, the town has 1,460.21 hectares of grasslands and pasture, and 368.15 hectares of barren land.

=== Rivers ===
Naguilian is traversed by two major rivers. The Naguilian River, located in the western portion of the town, originates from the province of Benguet and flows westward through La Union, eventually emptying into the Lingayen Gulf and South China Sea. This river drains the valleys of Barangays Bimmotobot, Mamat-ing Sur, Mamat-ing Norte, Tuddingan, Gusing Sur, Gusing Norte, Baraoas Norte, Daramuangan, Dal-lipaoen, Cabaritan Sur, Ortiz, Natividad, Suguidan Norte, and Suguidan Sur. It stretches approximately 67 kilometers (42 miles) with a basin area of 658 square kilometers (254 square miles).

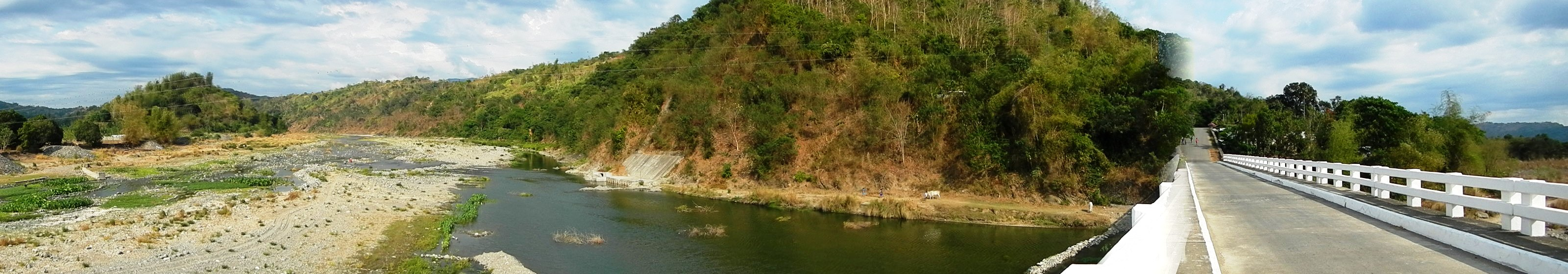
Gatchalian Sr. Bridge along Barangay Tudingan

The upper reaches of the river are classified as Class A by the Environmental Management Bureau, indicating suitability as a water source for drinking, while the lower reaches have lower water quality and are categorized under Class C.

The second major waterway springs from the Municipality of Burgos and flows through the valleys of Barangays Aguioas, Sili, Al-alinao Norte, Nagsidorisan, Angin, Suguidan Norte, and Natividad. These two rivers converge at the poblacion, forming a delta that flows through the center of Naguilian before emptying at the river's mouth in Bauang.

=== Climate ===
Naguilian is classified under the 1st Climatic Type of the Corona Climate Classification, which is characterized by two distinct seasons: a dry season from November to April and a wet season from May to October. The Southwest Monsoon (SWM) brings heavy rainfall during the wet season, while the Northeast Monsoon (NEM) causes relatively dry conditions as it passes over the Cordillera Mountains. Rainfall is not evenly distributed throughout the year, with the peak rainfall occurring from July to September.

The average temperature in the municipality is 27.5 °C, with a maximum of 29.2 °C in May and a minimum of 25.8 °C in January. Prevailing winds generally blow from the south to the west, and from the southwest to the east, with both the North and South Monsoons influencing the area. The municipality is susceptible to hydro-meteorological hazards, including flooding, rain-induced landslides, and tension cracks, particularly during intense typhoons brought on by heavy monsoon rains.

Climate data for Naguilian, La Union
Month	Jan	Feb	Mar	Apr	May	Jun	Jul	Aug	Sep	Oct	Nov	Dec	Year
Mean daily maximum °C (°F)	30 (86)	31 (88)	32 (90)	33 (91)	32 (90)	31 (88)	30 (86)	30 (86)	30 (86)	31 (88)	31 (88)	31 (88)	31 (88)
Mean daily minimum °C (°F)	21 (70)	22 (72)	23 (73)	25 (77)	26 (79)	26 (79)	26 (79)	25 (77)	25 (77)	24 (75)	23 (73)	22 (72)	24 (75)
Average precipitation mm (inches)	42 (1.7)	48 (1.9)	74 (2.9)	110 (4.3)	269 (10.6)	275 (10.8)	362 (14.3)	325 (12.8)	330 (13.0)	306 (12.0)	126 (5.0)	61 (2.4)	2,328 (91.7)
Average rainy days	11.2	12.0	17.1	21.2	27.1	26.8	28.1	27.0	26.0	24.5	17.7	12.4	251.1
Source: Meteoblue

=== Barangays ===
Naguilian is politically subdivided into 37 barangays. With upland and lowland barangay which each barangay consists of puroks and some have sitios. Among these barangays, Casilagan has the widest land area of 903.38 hectares and Imelda the smallest with only 46.09 hectares.

- Aguioas
- Al-alinao Norte
- Al-alinao Sur
- Ambaracao Norte
- Ambaracao Sur
- Angin
- Balecbec
- Bancagan
- Baraoas Norte
- Baraoas Sur
- Bariquir
- Bato
- Bimmotobot
- Cabaritan Norte
- Cabaritan Sur
- Casilagan
- Dal-lipaoen
- Daramuangan
- Guesset
- Gusing Norte
- Gusing Sur
- Imelda
- Lioac Norte
- Lioac Sur
- Magungunay
- Mamat-ing Norte
- Mamat-ing Sur
- Nagsidorisan
- Natividad
- Ortiz
- Ribsuan
- San Antonio
- San Isidro
- Sili
- Suguidan Norte
- Suguidan Sur
- Tuddingan

== Demographics ==
Population census of Naguilian
Year	Pop.	±% p.a.
1903	11,885	—
1918	14,828	+1.49%
1939	15,933	+0.34%
1948	15,227	−0.50%
1960	19,528	+2.09%
1970	25,177	+2.57%
1975	27,114	+1.50%
1980	29,304	+1.57%
1990	36,328	+2.17%
1995	39,989	+1.82%
2000	43,501	+1.82%
2007	45,232	+0.54%
2010	48,407	+2.50%
2015	54,221	+2.18%
2020	52,189	−0.80%
2024	53,443	+0.57%
Source: Philippine Statistics Authority

=== Population ===
As of the 2020 Philippine Statistic Authority Census report, the population of Naguilian, La Union was recorded at 52,189, showing a decrease of 2,016 from the 54,159 reported in 2015. The number of households in 2020 was 12,915, marking an increase of 754 households from the 12,161 reported in 2015.

=== Household Size ===
The average household size (AHS) in Naguilian decreased from 4.5 persons in 2015 to 4.0 persons in 2020. This trend continued from 2010 when the AHS was also recorded at 4.5. Seventeen of the 37 barangays had an AHS greater than the municipal average.

Among the 37 barangays of Naguilian, Baraoas Sur had the highest number of households in 2020 with 844, followed by Natividad (Pob.) with 744, Ortiz (Pob.) with 706, and Bariquir with 539. These four barangays comprised 21.94% of the total households in the municipality. The barangay of Cabaritan Norte had the fewest households, with only 127.

=== Birth Registration ===
Of the 51,943 persons whose births were registered with the Local Civil Registry Office (LCRO), 50.56% were male, totaling 26,262 persons, and 49.44% were female, totaling 25,681 persons. This resulted in a sex ratio of 102 male births for every 100 female births.

=== Sex Distribution ===
In 2020, the household population of Naguilian was composed of 50.57% males and 49.43% females, resulting in a sex ratio of 102 males for every 100 females. This sex ratio was consistent with the one recorded in 2015.

=== Age Distribution ===
In 2020, children aged 0 to 14 years made up 25.65% of the population, with a sex ratio of 108 males for every 100 females in this group. The working-age population, ages 15 to 64 years, represented 66.44% of the population, with a sex ratio of 105 males for every 100 females. Those aged 65 and over made up 7.91% of the population, with a sex ratio of 72 males for every 100 females.

=== Median Age ===
The median age of the household population in 2020 was 29.17 years, an increase from 27.58 years recorded in 2015. Children aged 15 to 19 years comprised the largest age group at 9.22%, followed by those in the 10 to 14 years group at 9.04% and 20 to 24 years group at 8.66%. Males outnumbered females in the age groups up to 54 years, while females outnumbered males in the older age groups, particularly those 55 years and older.

=== Voting-Age Population ===
In 2020, the town has 36,150 registered voters, the voting-age population (18 years and over) accounted for 68.82% of the total household population, up from 66.96% in 2015. Among the voting-age population, 50.01% were female and 49.99% were male.

=== Dependency Ratio ===
In 2020, the overall dependency ratio was 49 dependents per 100 working-age persons, a decrease from 51 dependents per 100 working-age persons in 2015. Of the total population, 25.65% were young dependents (ages 0 to 14), while 7.91% were old dependents (ages 65 and over). The working-age population (ages 15 to 64) made up 66.44% of the total population.

=== Marital Status ===
Among the household population aged 10 years and older, 43.48% were married, 36.64% were never married, 5.72% were widowed, 12.35% were in a common-law or live-in marital arrangement, and 1.81% were divorced or separated. Among those who had never been married, 55.32% were male and 44.68% were female.

=== Literacy Rate ===
Naguilian had a literacy rate of 99.17% among the household population aged 5 years and older. Males had a slightly higher literacy rate at 50.50%, compared to 49.50% for females.

=== Language and Ethnicity ===
The majority of Naguilian's population is Ilocano, with indigenous groups such as the Kankanaey and Ibaloi primarily residing in the upland areas. Iloco is the primary language spoken, with Filipino and English used in government and business. English is also the primary medium of instruction in schools.

=== Religion ===
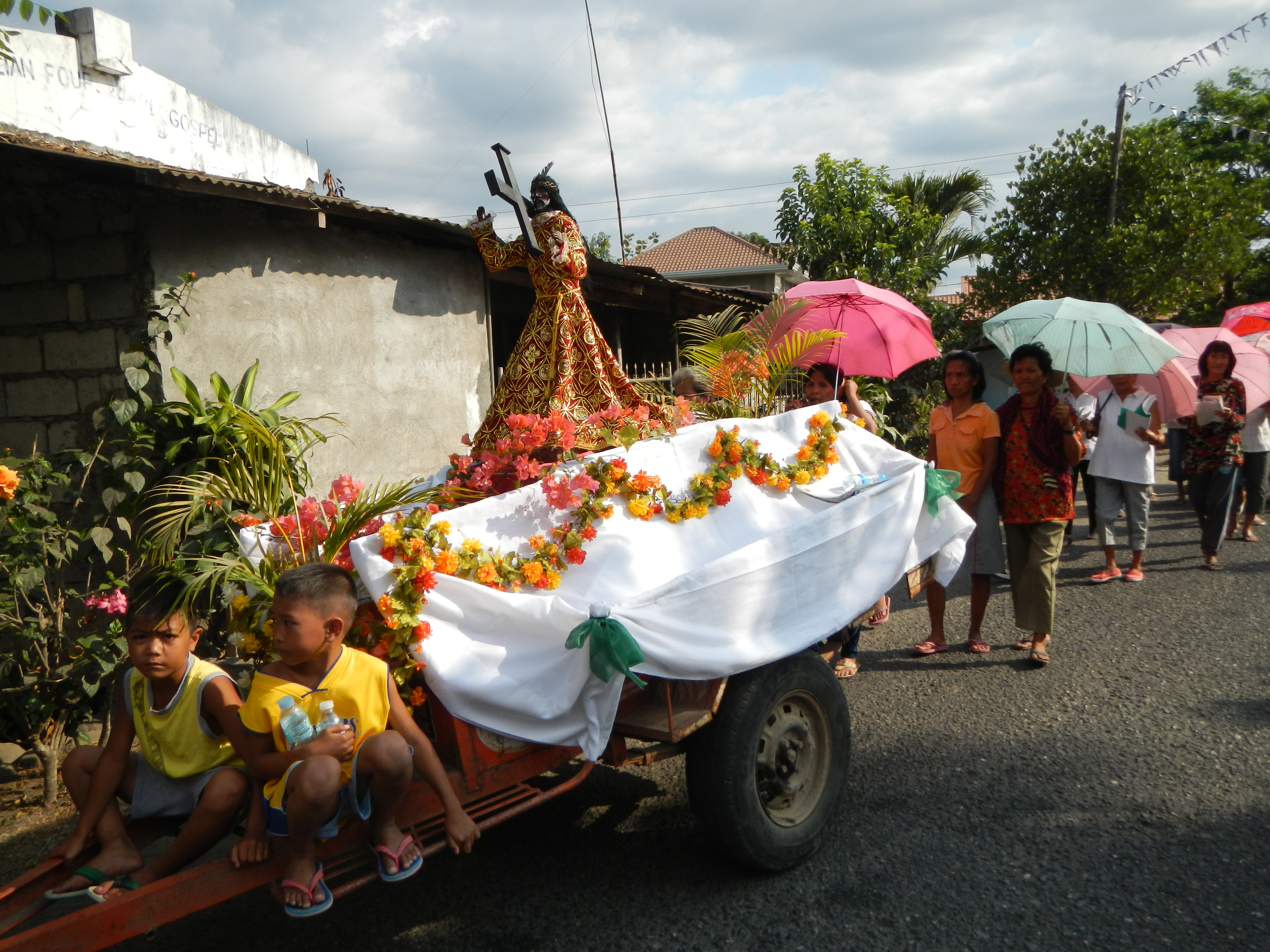
A Catholic devotee procession

Naguilian is predominantly Roman Catholic, though various other Christian denominations, including Iglesia ni Cristo, Protestant groups, and Jehovah's Witnesses, are also present. Smaller communities practicing Islam and Buddhism can also be found in the town.

=== Healthcare ===
Naguilian is served by the Naguilian District Hospital, which was established on March 23, 1972, and serves as the main healthcare facility for the town and its neighboring areas.

== Education ==
The Naguilian Schools District Office governs all educational institutions within the municipality. It oversees the management and operations of all private and public elementary and high schools.

Among the household population aged 5 years and older, 21.65% had attended or completed elementary education, 43.29% had reached or completed high school, 9.70% were college undergraduates, and 14.89% held academic degrees. Among those with academic degrees, 58.06% were female and 41.94% were male. Additionally, 67.05% of individuals pursuing post-baccalaureate courses were female, while 32.95% were male.

The municipality has 26 public elementary schools, 6 public secondary schools and 1 state university mainly Don Mariano Marcos Memorial State University-East La Union Campus (DMMMSU-ELUC), providing education to children and young adults in the area.

=== Primary and elementary schools ===
- Al-Alinao Elementary School
- Al-alinao Sur Elementary School
- Amadeo Florendo Florendo Rimando Elementary School
- Ambaracao Sur Elementary School
- Balecbec Elementary School
- Bancagan Elementary School
- Baraoas Norte Elementary School
- Baraoas Sur Elementary School
- Bariquir Elementary School
- Bato Elementary School
- Bimmotobot 2 Upper Primary School
- Casilagan Elementary School
- Don Tomas R. Mendoza Elementary School
- Dr. Hermogenes T. Belen Elementary School
- Guesset Elementary School
- Gusing Elementary School
- Lioac Elementary School
- Lower Bimmotobot Elementary School
- Mamat-ing Norte Elementary School
- Mamat-ing Sur Elementary School
- Mangkaeng Primary School
- Nagsidorisan Elementary School
- Naguilian Baptist Christian School
- Naguilian Central School
- San Antonio Elementary School
- San Isidro Elementary School
- St. Augustine School of Naguilian
- Tuddinggan Elementary School

=== Secondary schools ===
- Cabaritan Sur Integrated School
- Daramuangan Integrated School
- Eastern Naguilian National High School
- Naguilian Learning Center
- Naguilian National High School
- Naguilian Senior High School
- Northern Naguilian National High School
- Southern Naguilian National High School
- Suguidan Integrated School

=== Higher educational institutions ===
- Colegio de La Union
- Don Mariano Marcos Memorial State University

== Economy ==
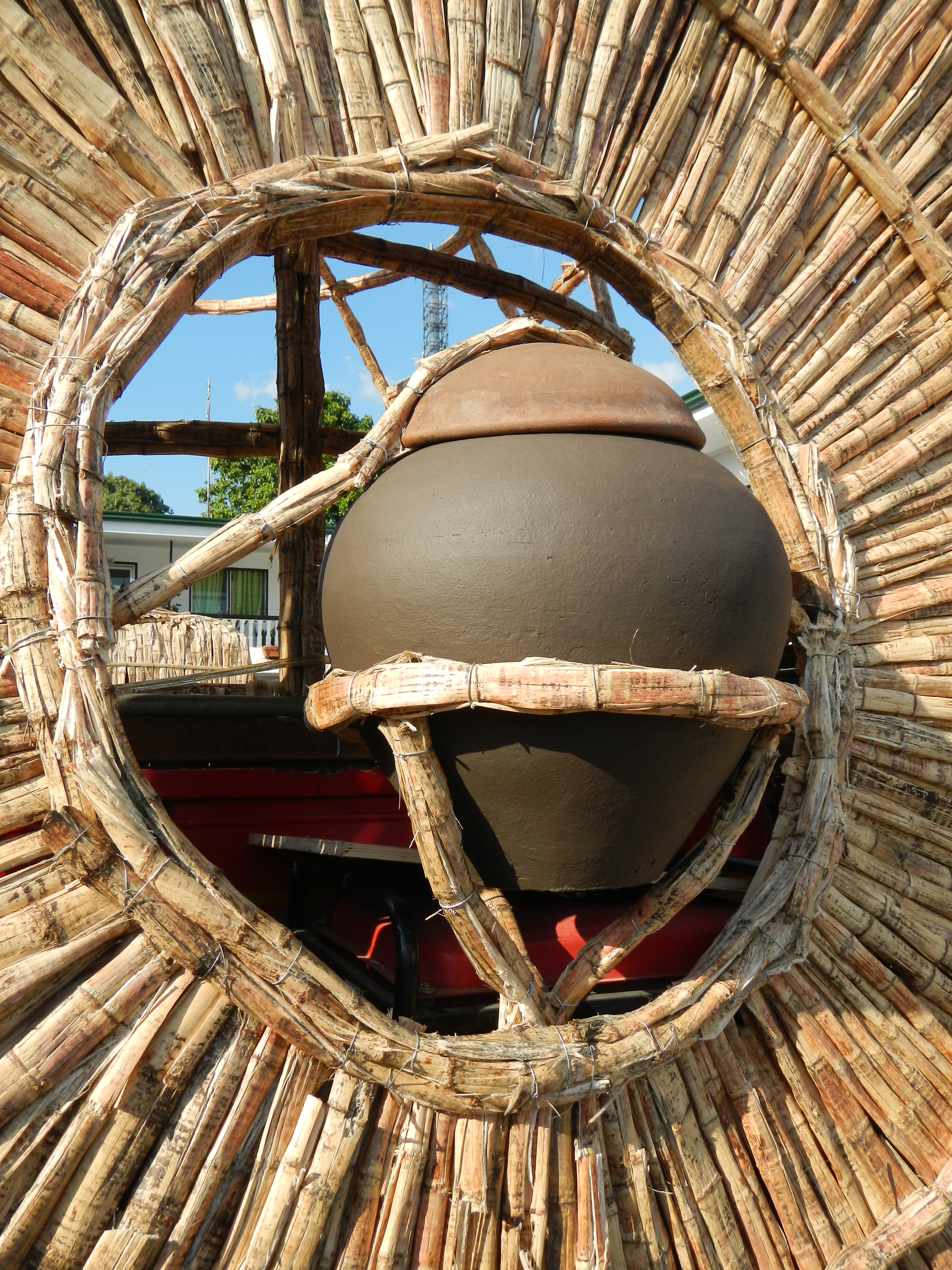
Basi wine, Naguilian One Town, One Product

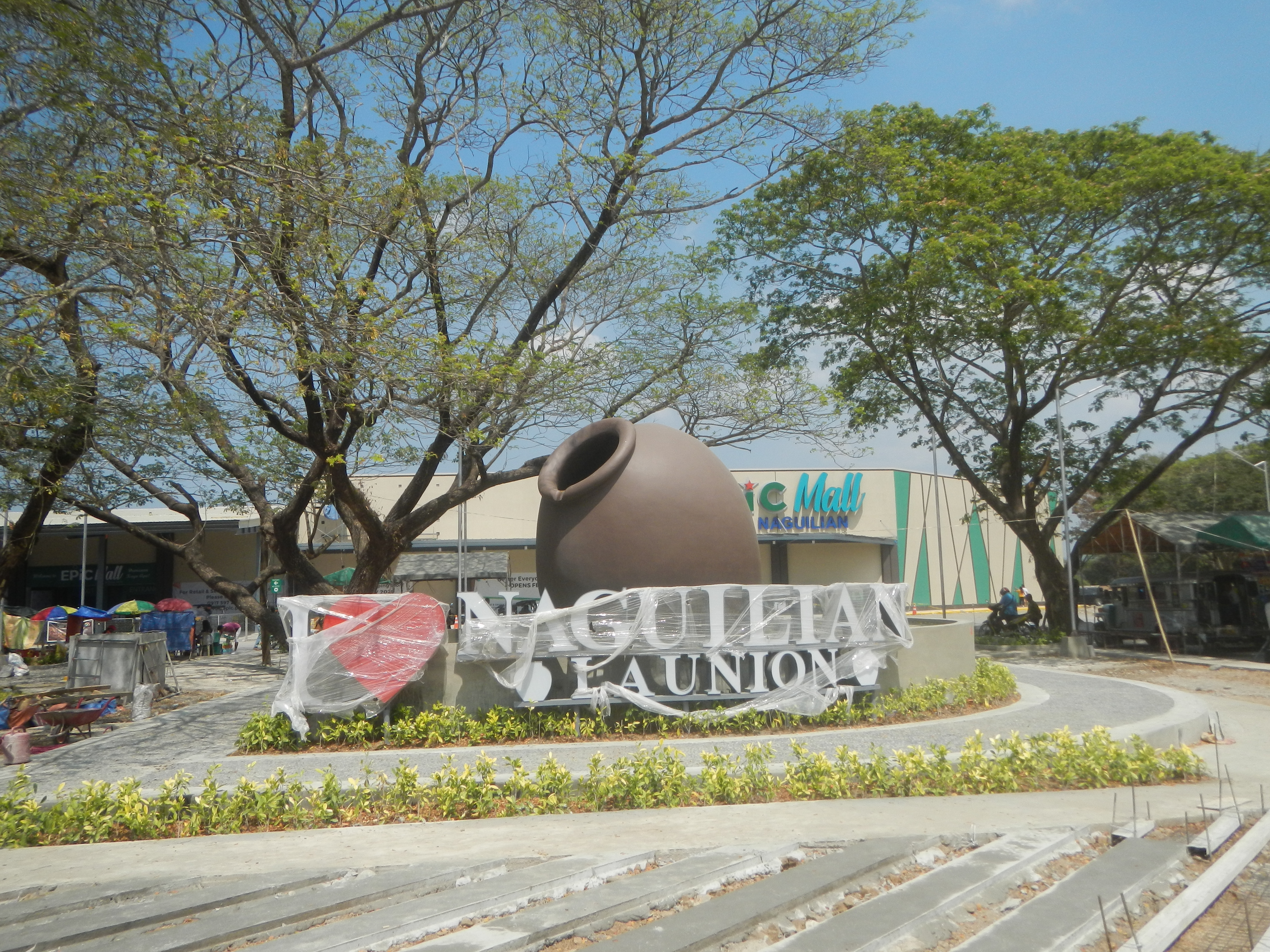
Naguilian Epic Mall driving Economic Growth

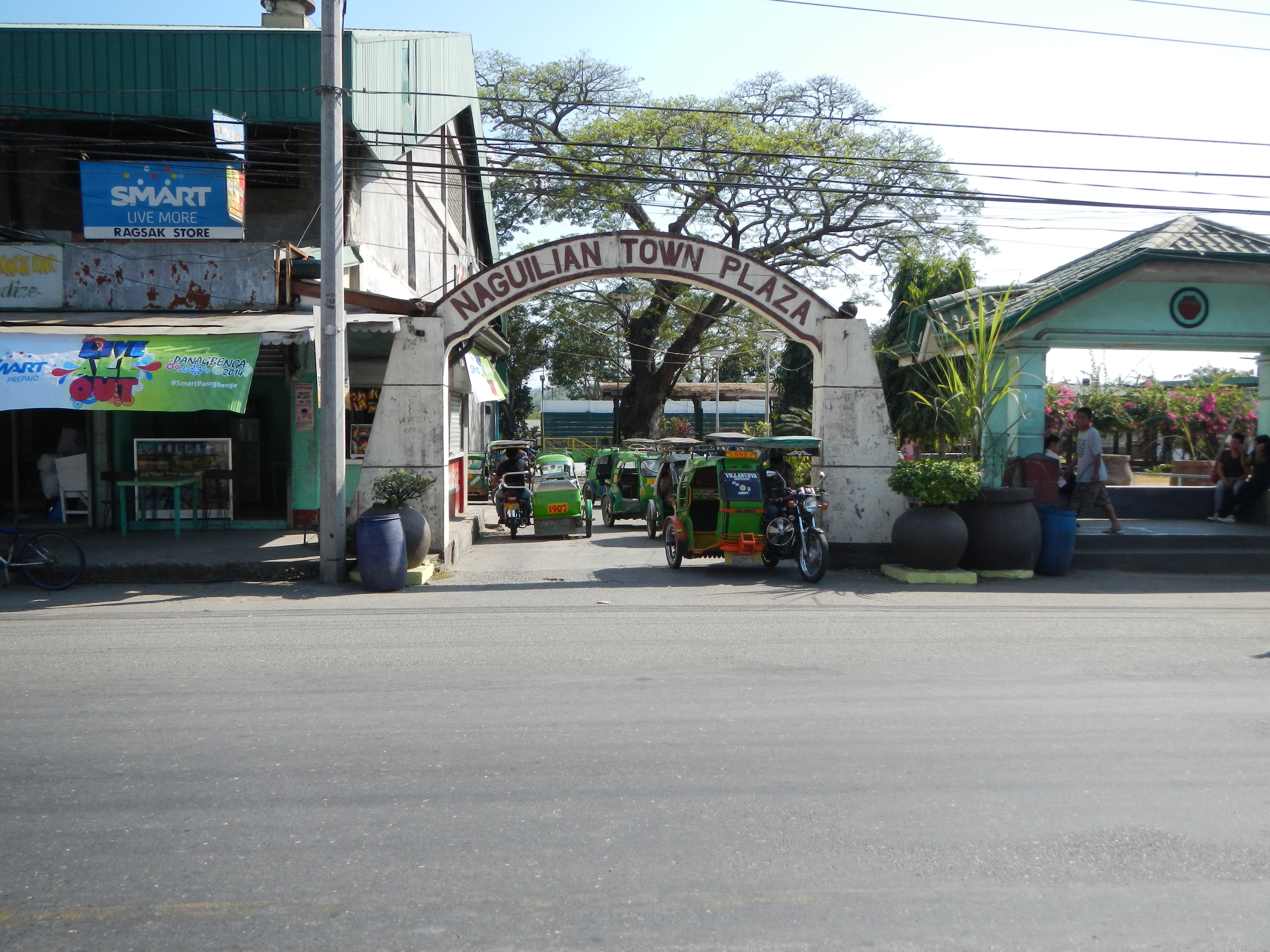
Naguilian Downtown proper heart of the Local Economy

=== Agriculture ===
Generally, the agricultural lands in the town consist of narrow strips situated in the valleys, extending from the lower slopes of the mountains to the banks of rivers, brooks, and streams. These fertile areas benefit from the natural irrigation provided by the water sources, making them ideal for various forms of agriculture. Additionally, the rolling terrain of the mountain and hilltops is also harnessed for the cultivation of rice, corn, tobacco, sugarcane, root crops, fruits, lowland vegetables and a variety of other crops. The agricultural landscape reflects a diverse range of farming practices that contribute significantly to the local economy.

The area devoted to agricultural purposes totals 9,859.71 hectares (24,363.9 acres), accounting for 97% of the total land area of the town. This extensive agricultural expanse supports both subsistence and commercial farming, providing livelihoods for many of the town’s residents. The dominance of agricultural land highlights the importance of farming in the region’s cultural and economic identity. In recent years, efforts have been made to improve farming practices, enhance irrigation systems, and diversify crops in order to boost productivity and sustainability in the agricultural sector.

=== Industries ===
The town is renowned as the home of the original Basi wine-making industry, a traditional Ilocano wine made from sugarcane juice that dates back to the World War II era. With the support of the local government, this industry has been revived and is now one of the main sources of income for the province. In addition to Basi, Naguillian is also known for its thriving woodcraft industry, with notable areas in Cabaritan Norte and Sur, Dallipaoen, and Al-alinao Norte. Barangays Bancagan and Daramuangan are also recognized for their bamboocraft industry. Other industries include metal craft, ceramics or brick-making, concrete hollow block production, and furniture making and upholstery. Currently, 28% of the town's total land area is dedicated to industrial purposes.

=== Commerce ===
The town has 19.41 exiting area for Commercial. The center of commercial activities is the public market located in Barangay Ortiz. There are, however, other commercial establishments found in the different barangays, the most common of which are sari-sari stores. The area devoted to commerce constitutes .03% of the total land area of the town.

=== Fishery ===
Fishing specifically aquaculture is done in almost all barangays traversed by the rivers, namely, Barangays Bimmotobot, Mamat-ing Sur, Mamat-ing Norte, Gusing Norte, Gusing Sur, Baraoas Norte, Baraoas Sur, Ortiz, Cabaritan Norte, Cabaritan Sur, Dal-lipaoen, Nagsidorisan, Suguidan Norte, Suguidan Sur, Guesset, Sili, Al-alinao Norte, Al-alinao Sur, Aguioas, and Ribsuan.

Poverty incidence of Naguilian (%)

Source: Philippine Statistics Authority

== Government ==
=== Local government ===
Naguilian, belonging to the second congressional district of the province of La Union, is governed by a mayor designated as its local chief executive and by a municipal council as its legislative body in accordance with the Local Government Code. The mayor, vice mayor, and the councilors are elected directly by the people through an election which is being held every three years.

=== Elected officials ===
Members of the Municipal Council (2022–Present)
Position	Name
Congressman	Dante S. Garcia
Mayor	Nieri T. Flores
Vice-Mayor	Reynaldo J. Flores
Councilors	Ruperto A. Rillera Jr.
Councilors	Diomedes F. Hipol
Councilors	Georgina F. Estepa-Flores
Councilors	Helen C. Casuga-Obispo
Councilors	Danilo T. Soriano
Councilors	Hulgar Redentor R. Rimando
Councilors	Aurelio F. Flora
Councilors	Roger A. Floresca

== Sister cities ==
- Suisun City, California, United States of America

== Notable personalities ==
- Hermogenes F. Belen, Ilocano-language novelist, poet, and playwright

== Gallery ==
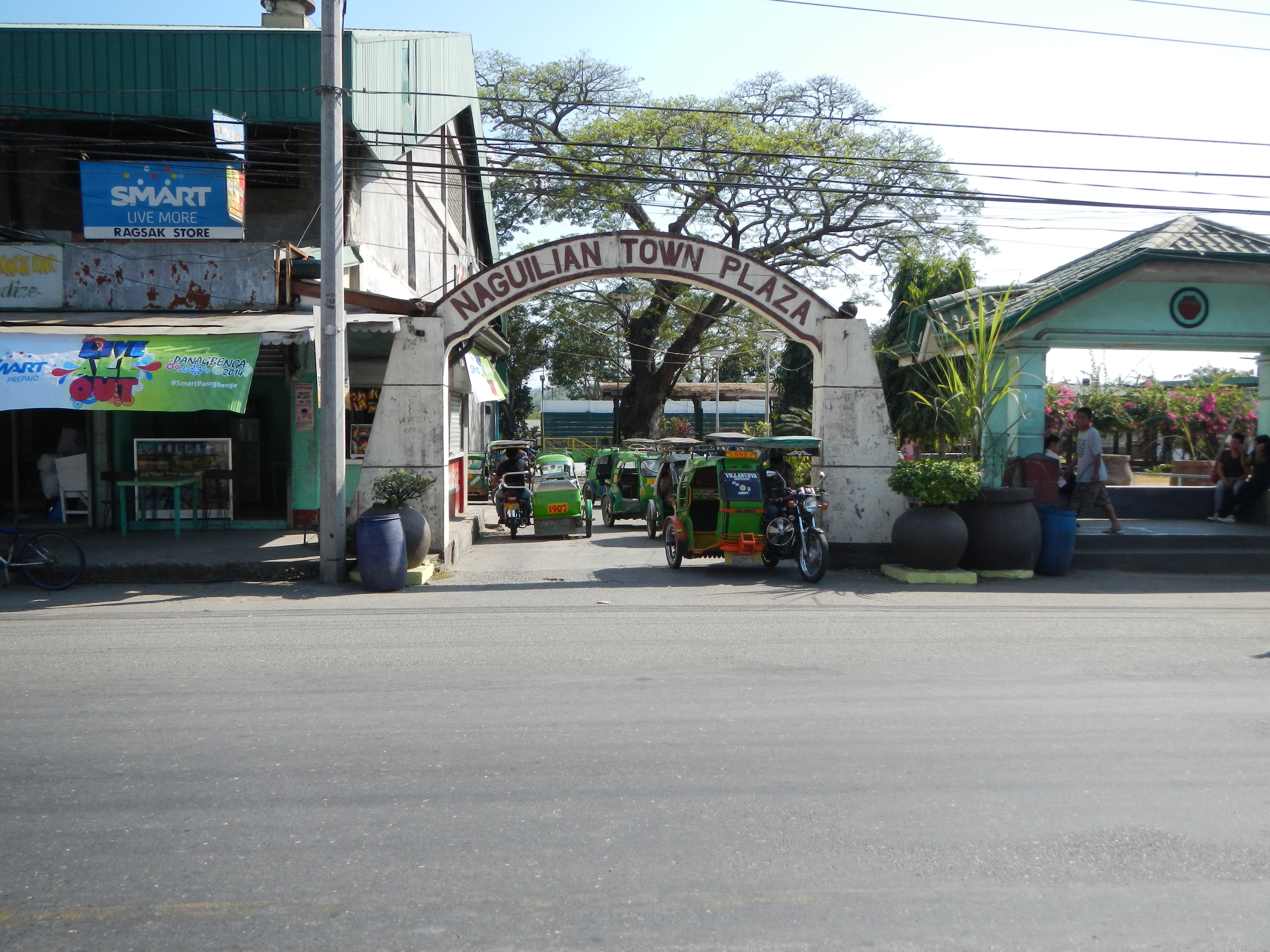
Town proper

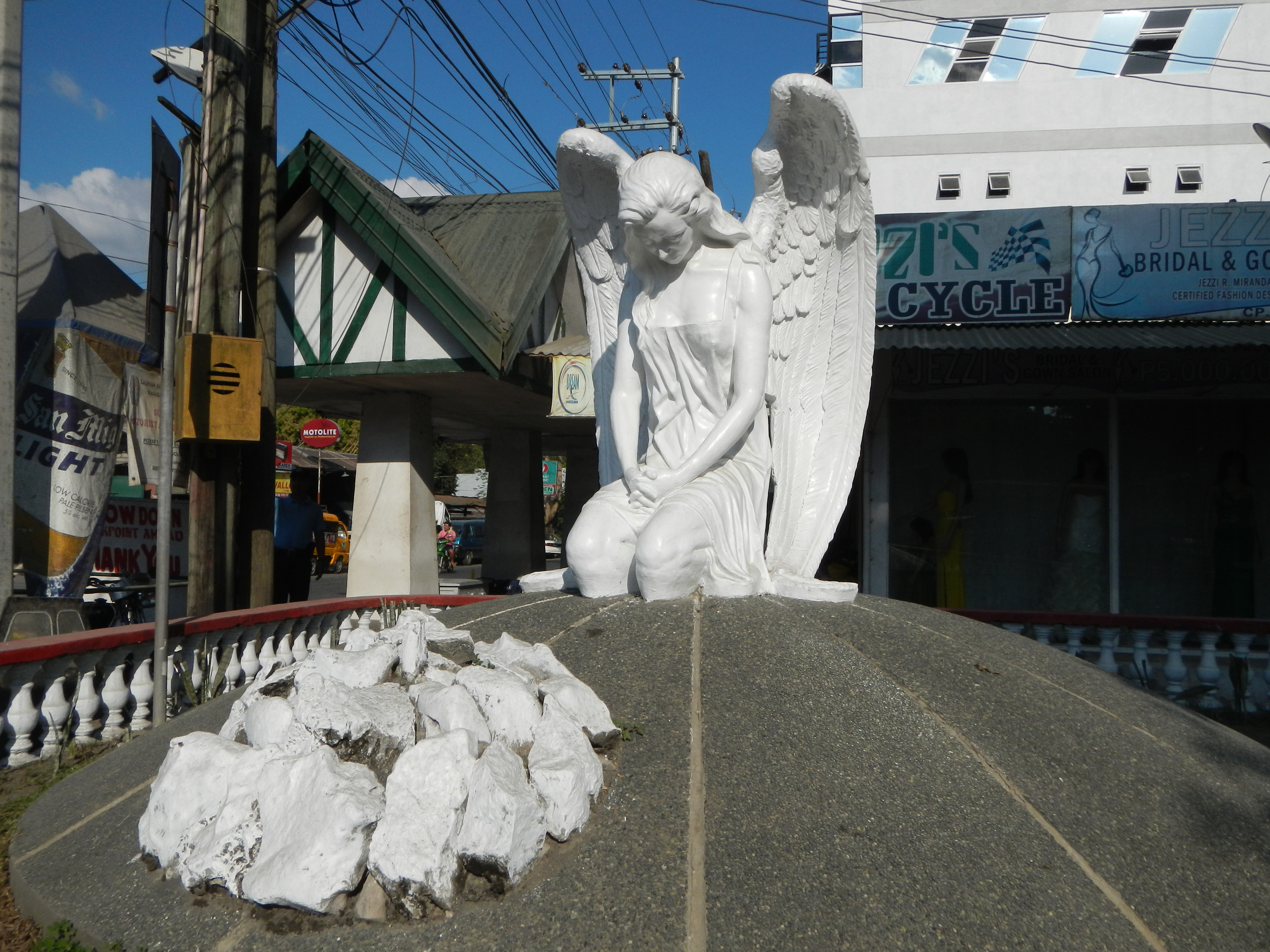
Naguilian Statue

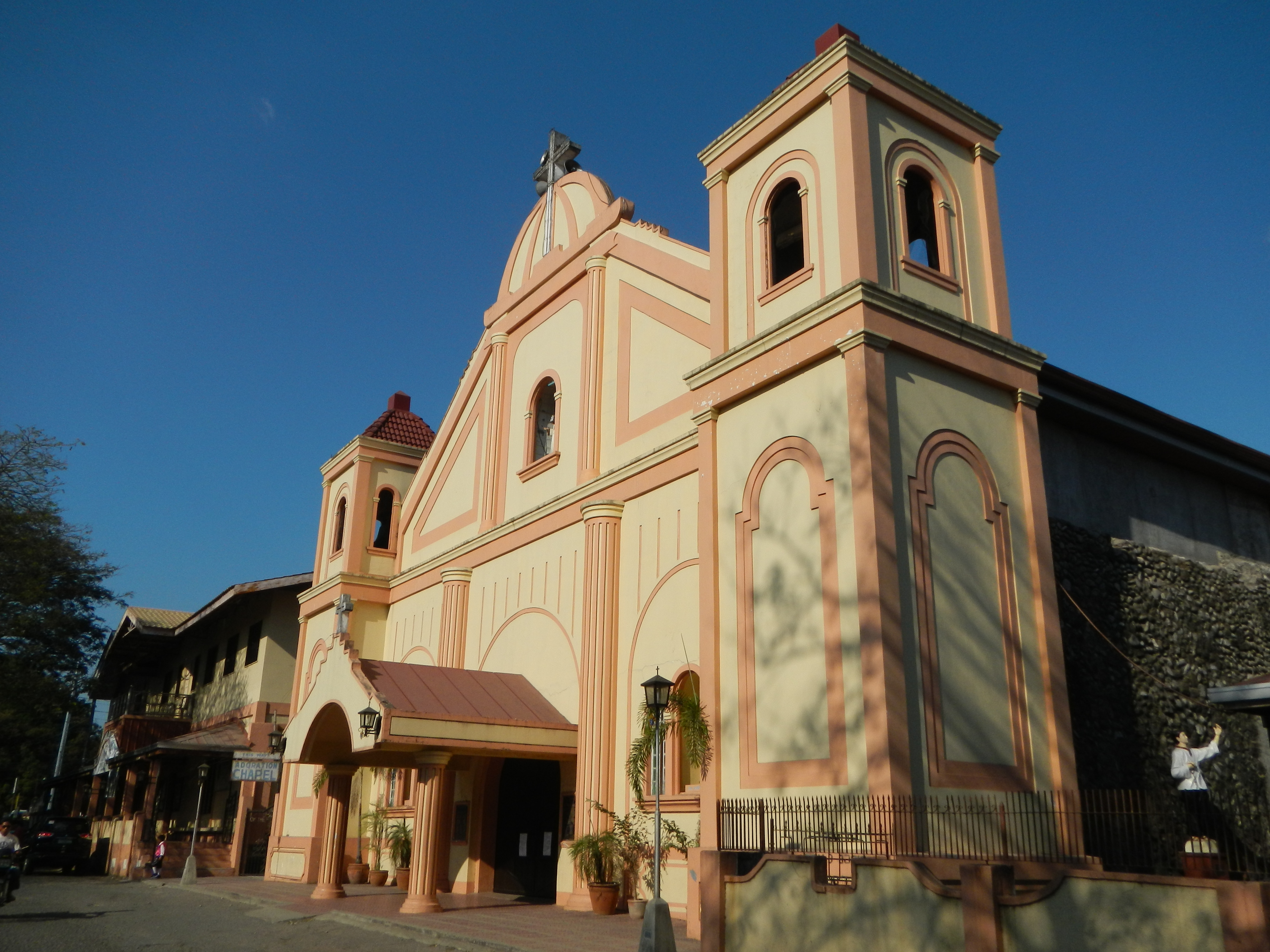
Facade of St. Augustine of Hippo Parish Church

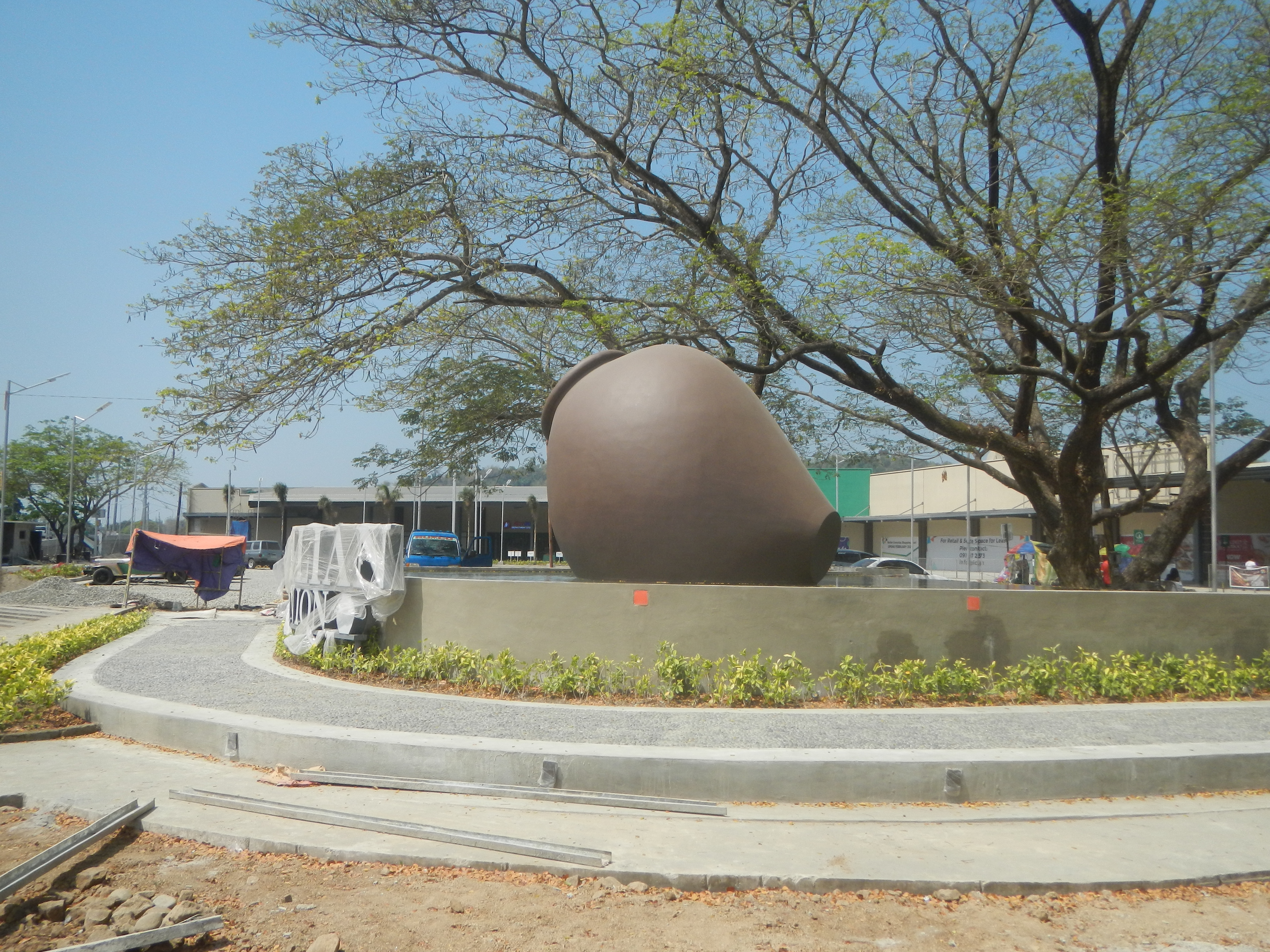
Naguilian Epic Mall

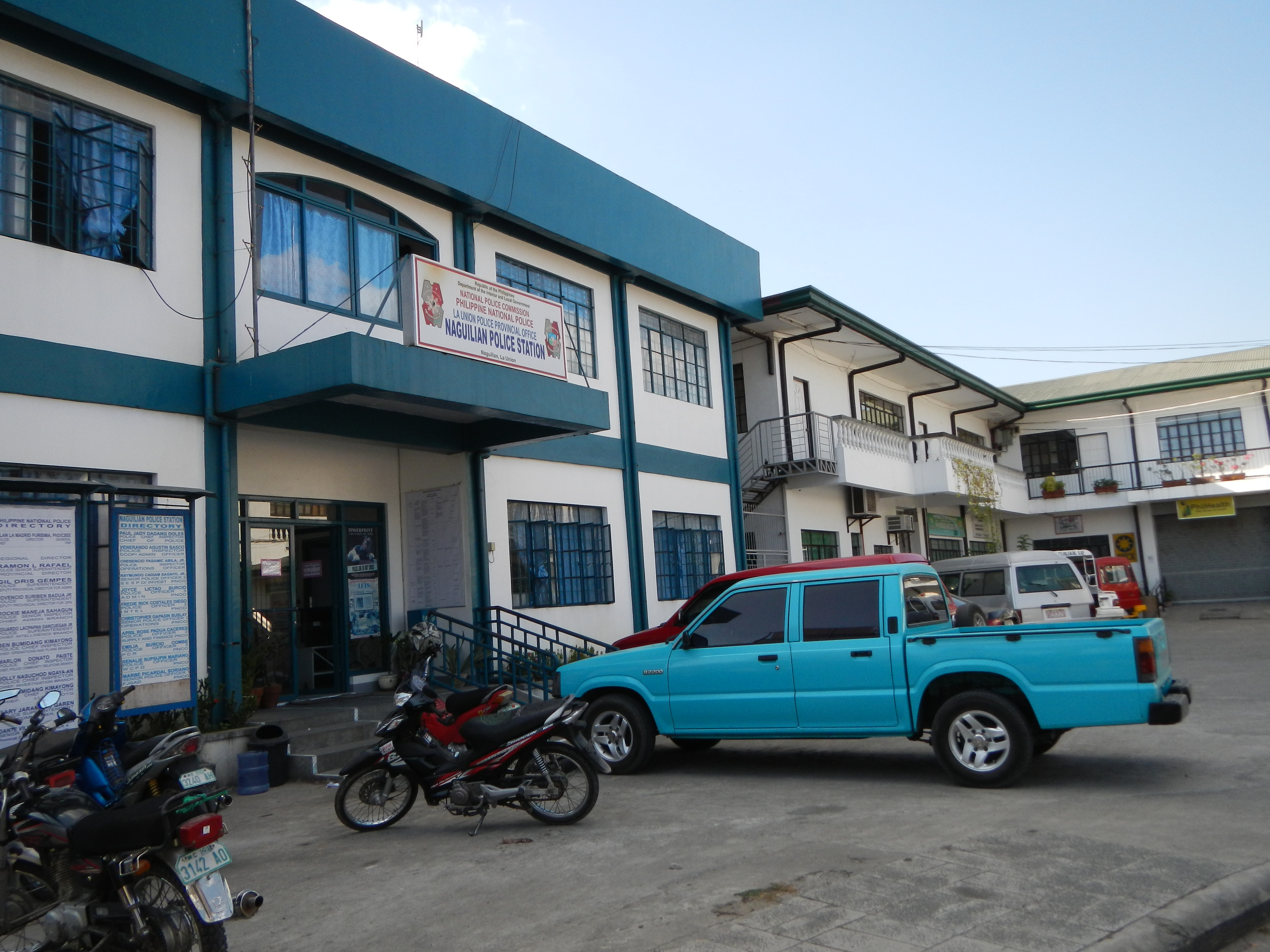
Naguilian Police Station

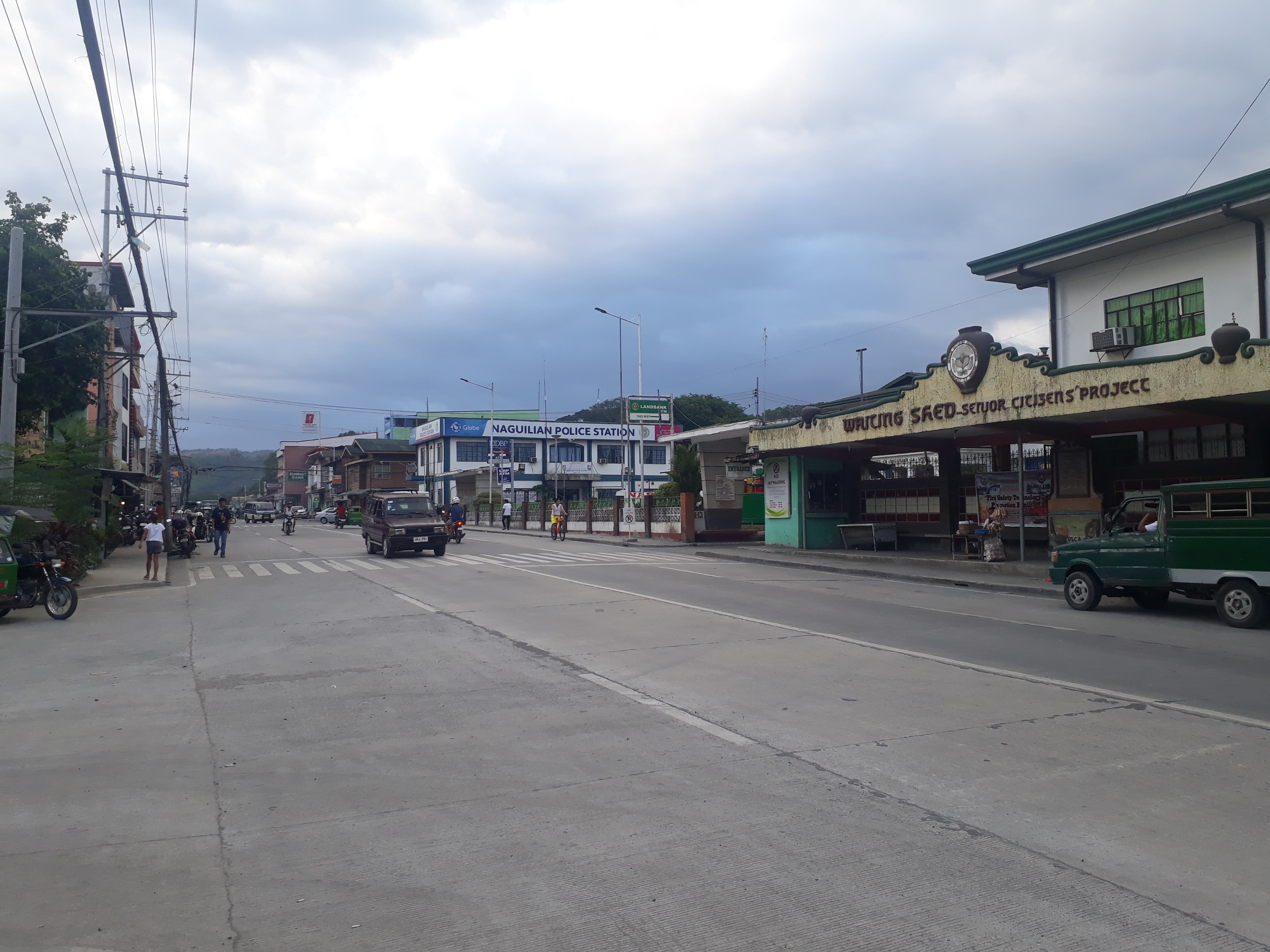
Naguilian Downtown proper

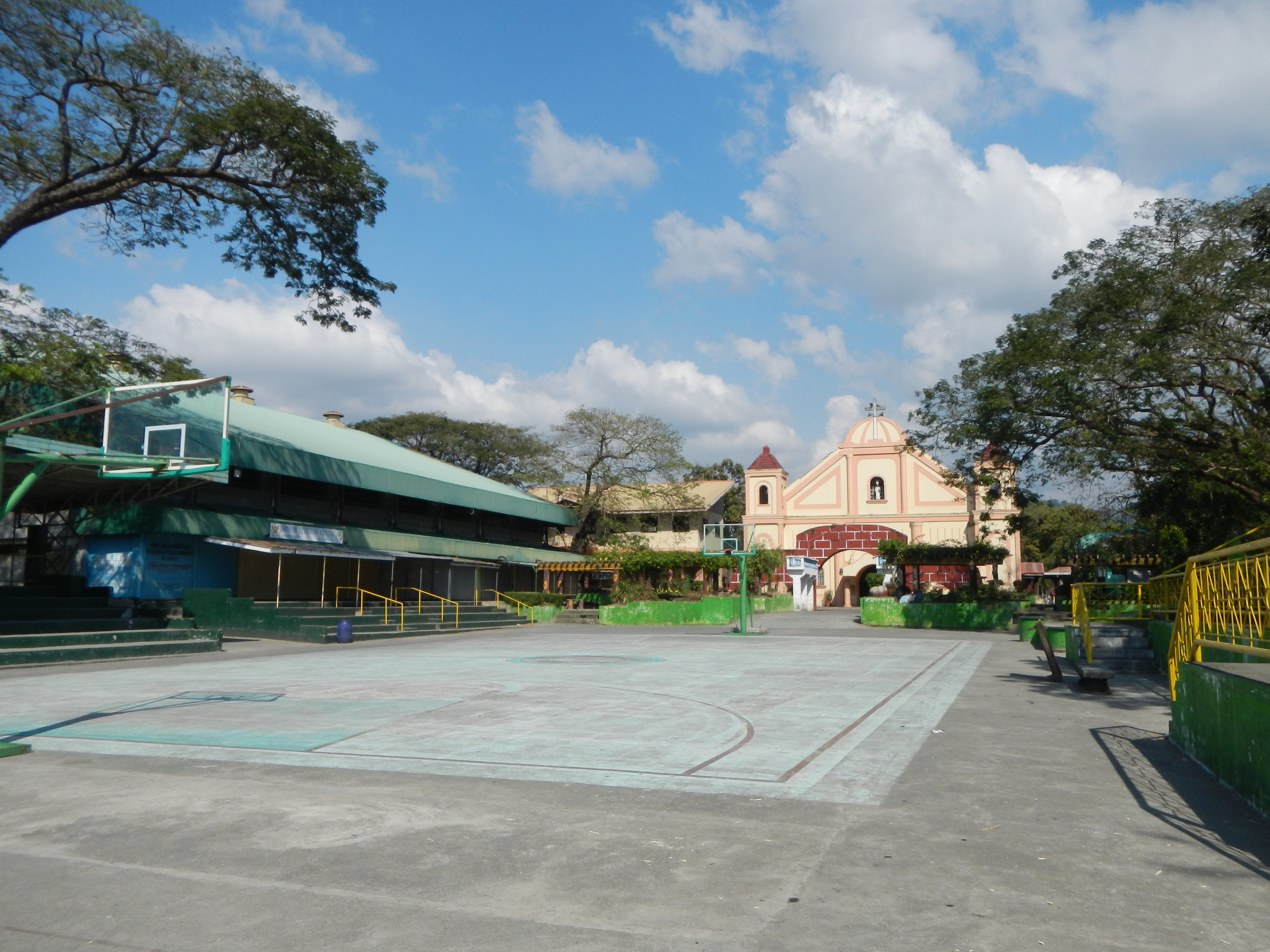
Naguilian Town Plaza

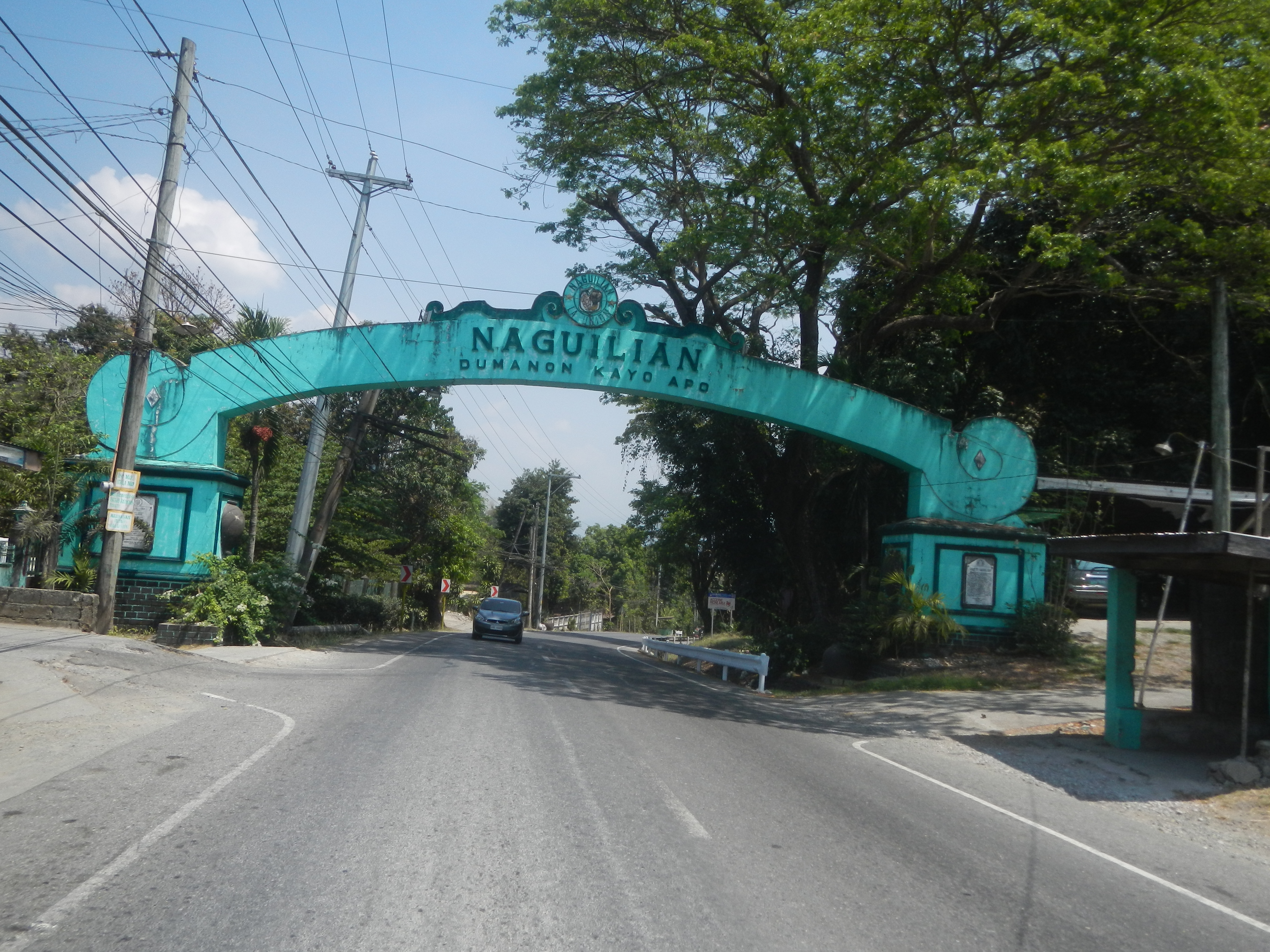
Welcome Arch Naguilian

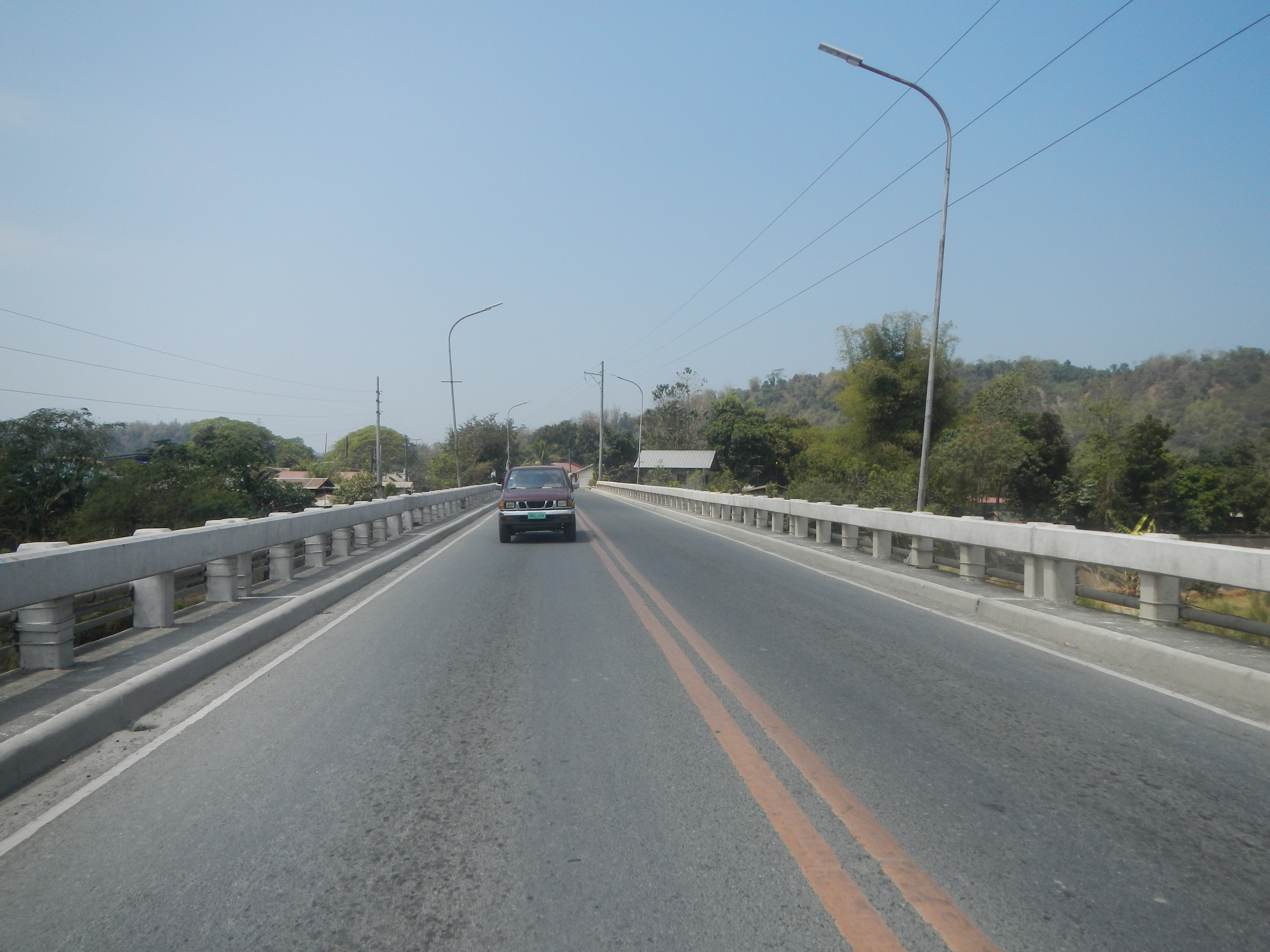
Naguilian Road along Naguilian Bridge
