= Jose Aspiras =

Filipino politician

The Honourable Jose Aspiras
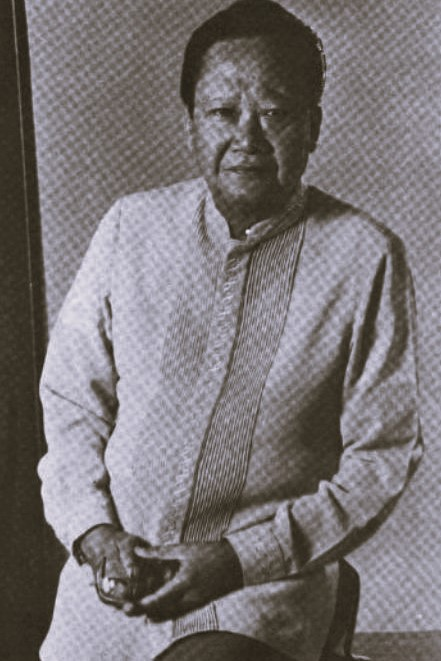
- Aspiras official portrait during the 8th Congress.

Member of the House of Representatives from La Union's 2nd district
- In office June 30, 1987 – June 30, 1998
- Preceded by: District re-established
- Succeeded by: Tomas Dumpit
- In office December 30, 1969 – September 23, 1972
- Preceded by: Epifanio Castillejos
- Succeeded by: District abolished

Minister of Tourism
- In office May 11, 1973 – February 25, 1986
- President: Ferdinand Marcos
- Preceded by: Position established
- Succeeded by: Jose Antonio Gonzales

Member of the Regular Batasang Pambansa
- In office July 23, 1984 – March 25, 1986
- Constituency: La Union

Press Secretary
- In office December 30, 1965 – December 1969
- President: Ferdinand Marcos
- Preceded by: Virgilio P. Reyes Sr.
- Succeeded by: Francisco Tatad (Minister of Public Information)

Personal details
- Born: Jose Diego Aspiras; August 18, 1924 San Fernando, La Union, Philippine Islands
- Died: November 14, 1999 (aged 75)
- Resting place: Basilica Minore of Our Lady of Charity, Agoo, La Union
- Party: Lakas (1995–1999); Bileg Ti La Union (local party; 1987–1999)
- Other political affiliations: NPC (1992–1995); Independent (1987–1992); KBL (1978–1987); Nacionalista (1969–1978)

Jose Diego Aspiras (August 18, 1924 – November 14, 1999) was a Filipino politician. He was a member of former President Ferdinand Marcos's cabinet, and was considered one of the most loyal political lieutenants from Marcos' “northern bloc” of political influence. He was the country's first Minister of Tourism, representative from La Union's 2nd district from 1969 to 1972 and from 1987 to 1998, and an assemblyman from La Union from 1984 to 1986. He is interred in the local Basilica Minore in Agoo, La Union.

The Agoo-Baguio Road was formerly named "Jose D. Aspiras Highway" after him but was renamed to Palispis Highway on October 31, 2000, with the issuance of Republic Act 8971.

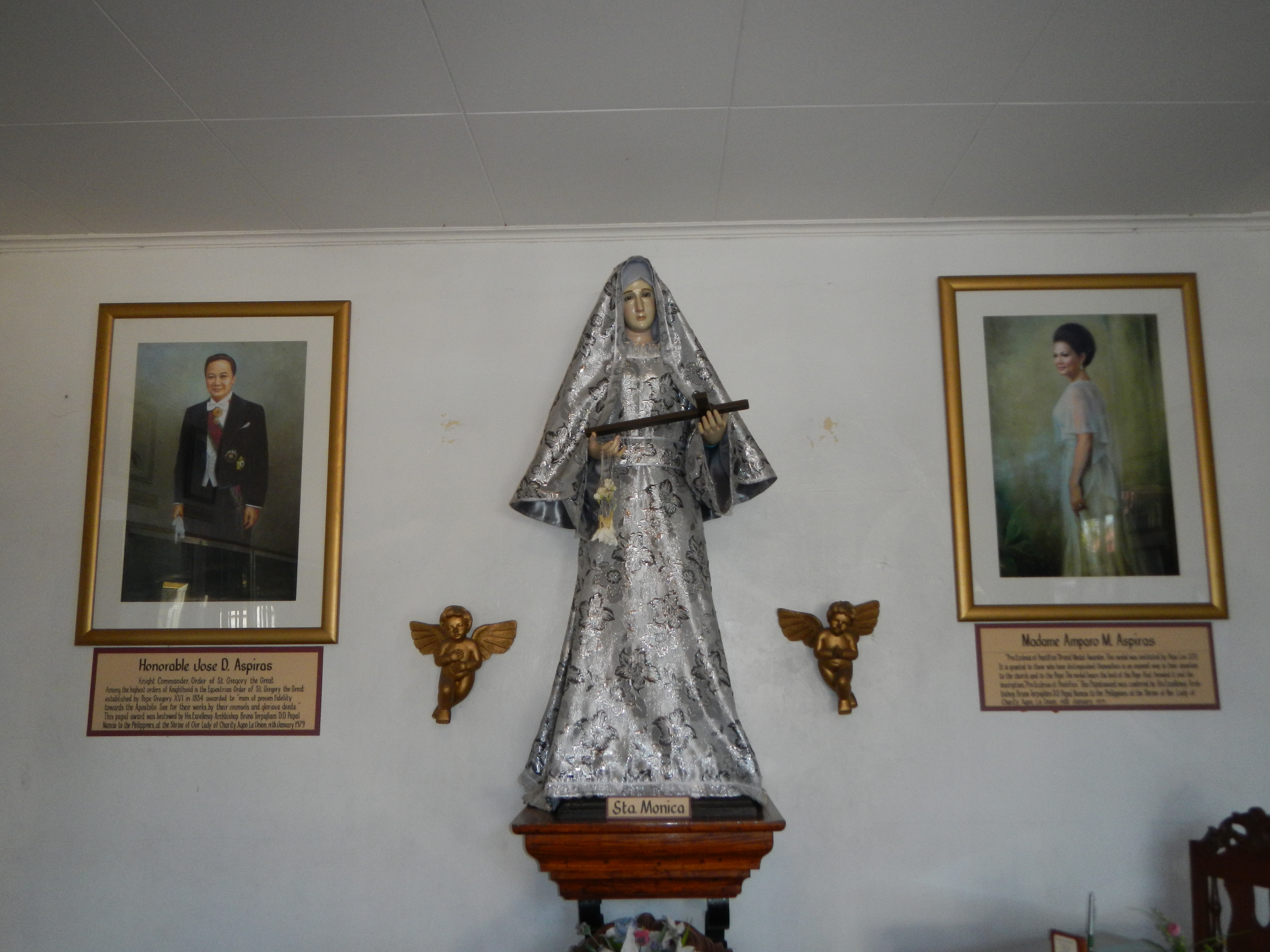
Portraits of Mr. & Mrs. Jose D. Aspiras at the Basilica of Our Lady of Charity.

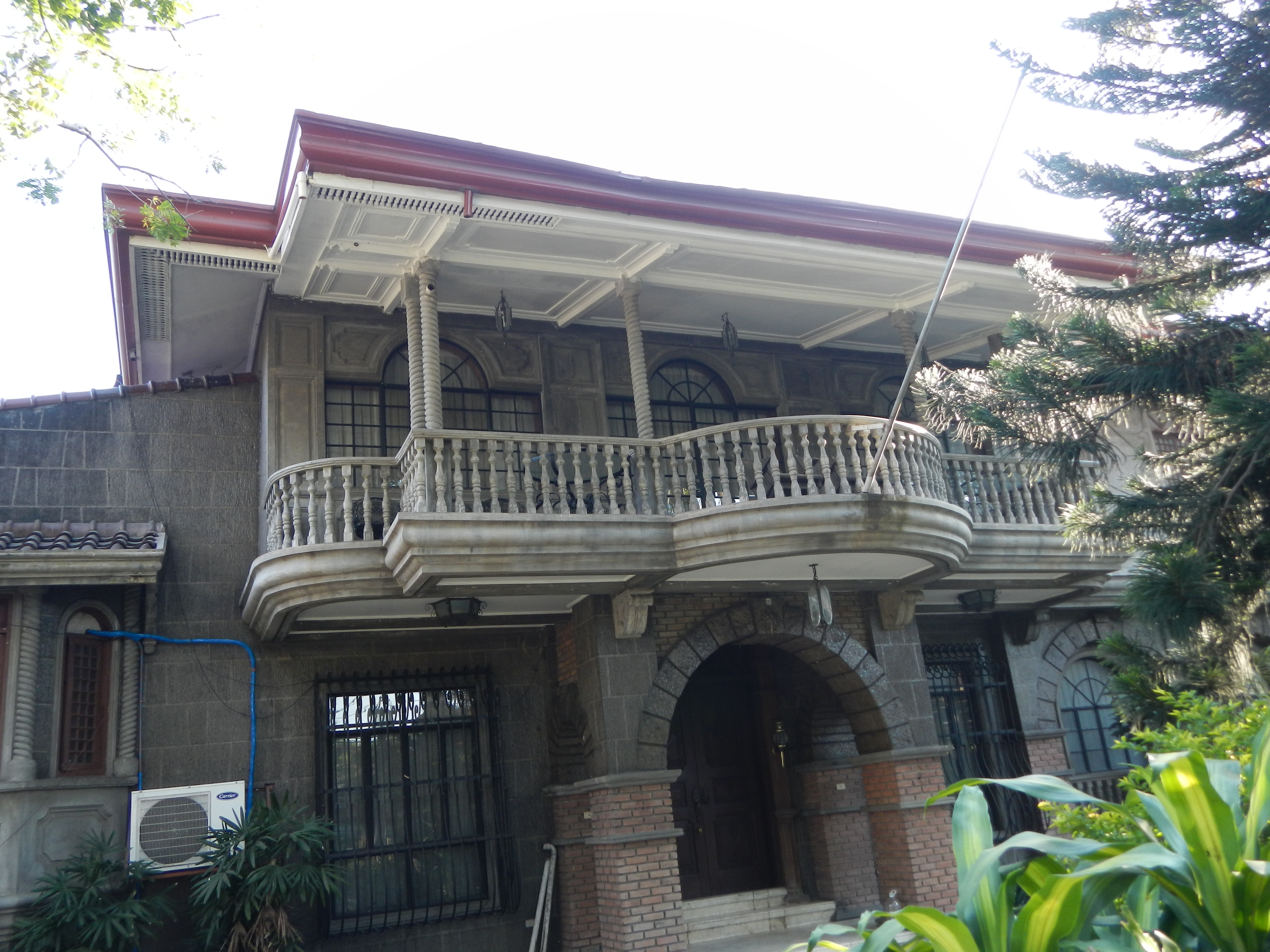
Facade of the ancestral house and lot of the late Jose D. Aspiras (Mrs. Aspiras resides herein, (Agoo, La Union)

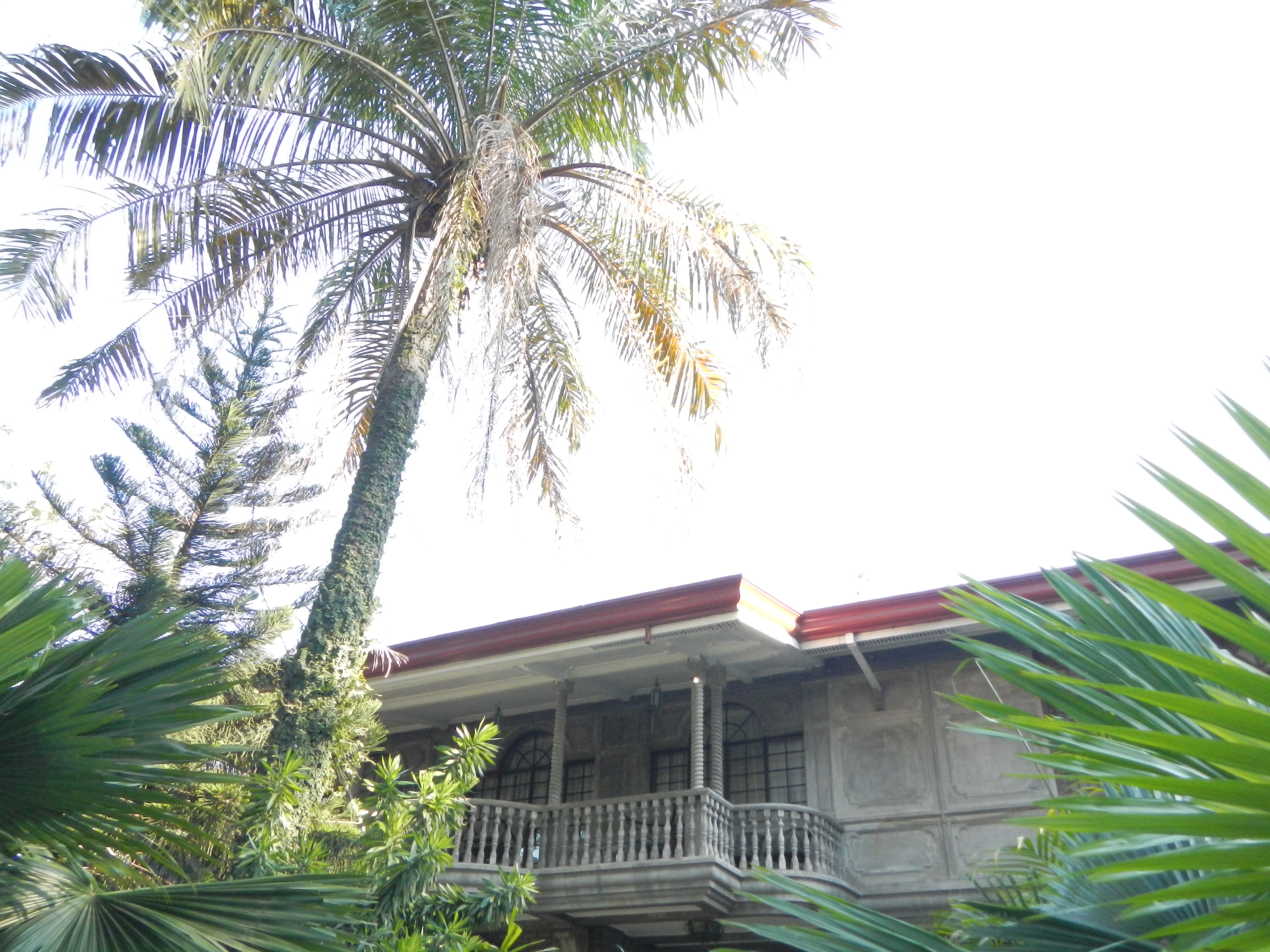
Frontage

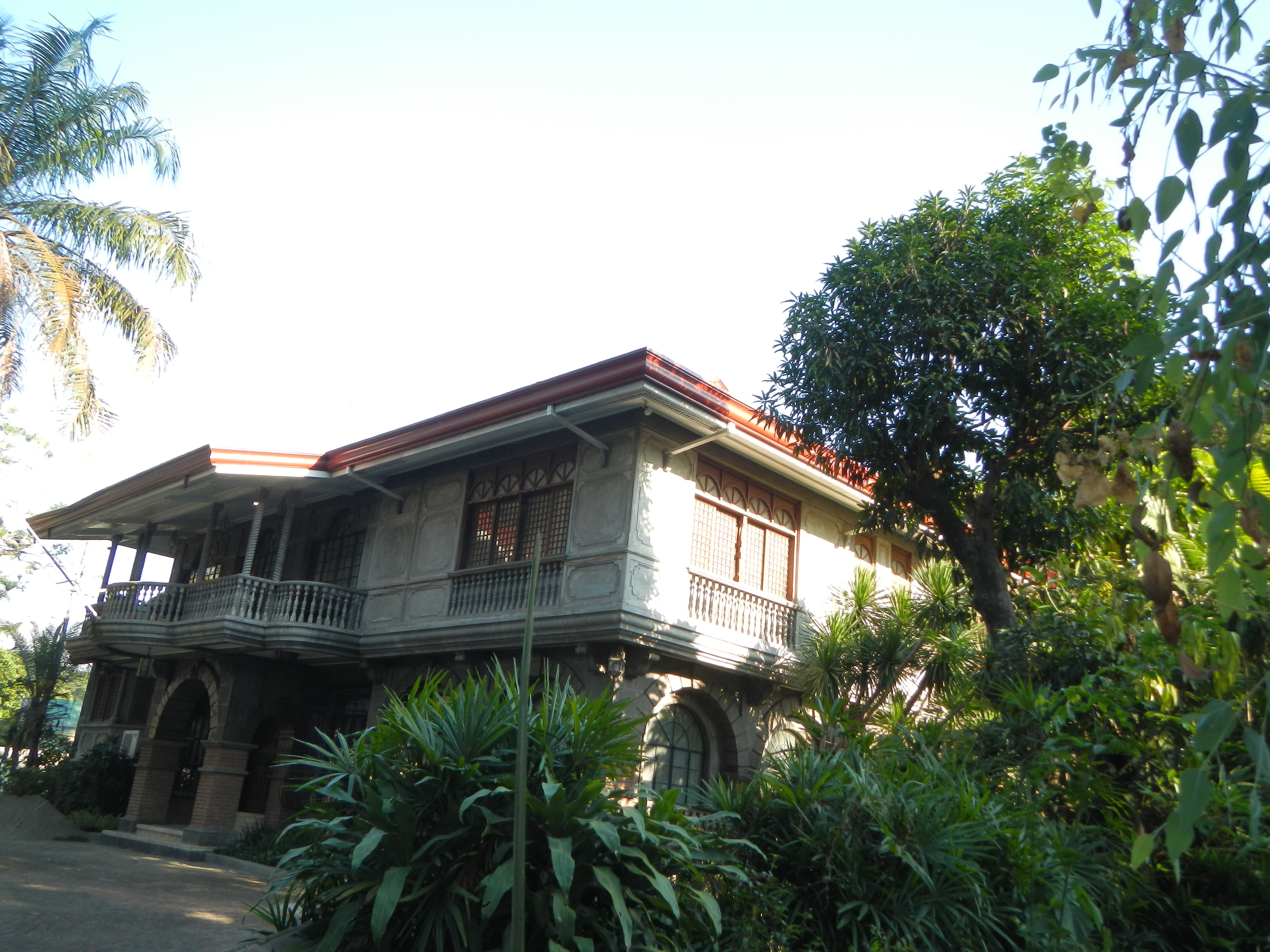
Right facade
