= Joaquin Luna =

Filipino revolutionary and politician

Joaquín Dámaso Luna
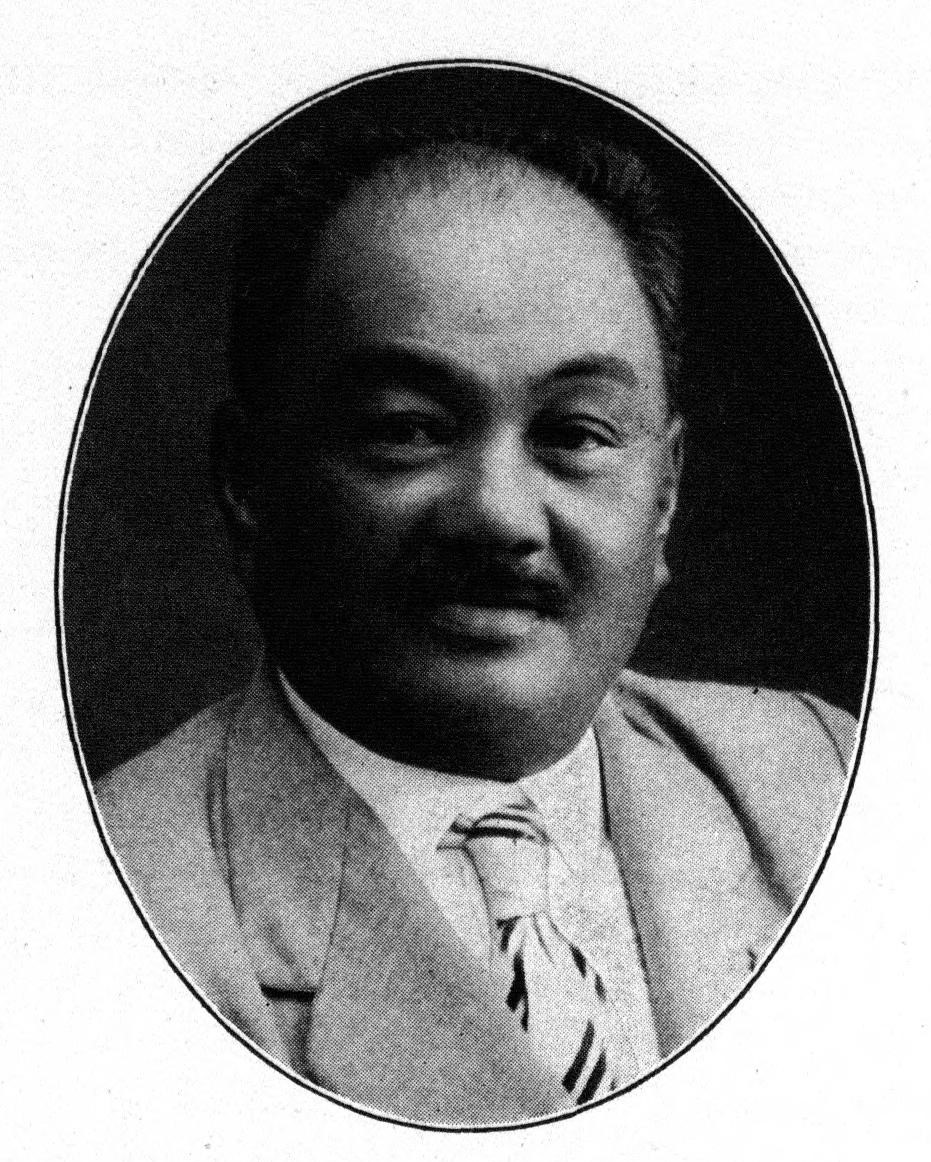
- Official portrait, c. 1917

Senator of the Philippines from the 12th district
- In office October 16, 1916 – July 1, 1920
- Appointed by: Francis Burton Harrison
- Preceded by: Position established
- Succeeded by: Lope K. Santos

Governor of Mountain Province
- In office 1920–1925
- Preceded by: Aquilino Calvo
- In office 1916
- Preceded by: E.A. Eckman
- Succeeded by: Aquilino Calvo

Member of the Philippine Assembly for La Union's 1st district
- In office 1910–1916
- Preceded by: Andrés Asprer
- Succeeded by: Juan T. Lucero (as Representative)

3rd Governor of La Union
- In office 1904–1907
- Preceded by: Joaquín J. Ortega
- Succeeded by: Sixto Zandueta

Member of the Malolos Congress from La Union
- In office September 15, 1898 – November 13, 1899 Serving with Miguel Paterno and Mateo del Rosario

Personal details
- Born: Joaquín Dámaso Luna de San Pedro y Novicio Ancheta; December 11, 1864 San Nicolas, Manila, Captaincy General of the Philippines, Spanish Empire
- Died: November 7, 1936 (aged 71) Mountain Province, Commonwealth of the Philippines
- Party: Nacionalista
- Relatives: Manuel Luna; Juan Luna; Antonio Luna

Military service
- Allegiance: First Philippine Republic
- Branch/service: Philippine Revolutionary Army
- Rank: Colonel

Joaquín Dámaso Luna de San Pedro y Novicio Ancheta (December 11, 1864 – November 7, 1936) was a Filipino revolutionary and politician. He was a colonel during the Philippine Revolution, senator (1916–1919), governor of La Union (1904–1907), governor of Mountain Province (1916, 1920–1925), and representative of La Union's 1st District (1910–1916).

== Personal life ==
Joaquín Luna was born on December 11, 1864. Brother to painter Juan Luna, violinist Manuel Luna, and General Antonio Luna, his parents were Don Joaquín Luna de San Pedro y Posadas and Doña Laurena Novicio y Ancheta.

== Career ==
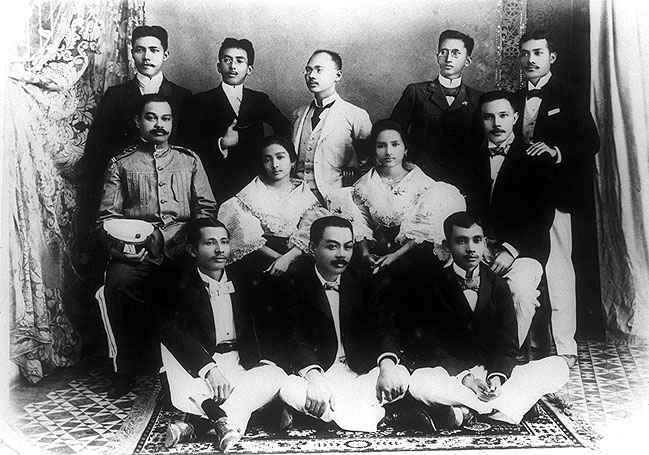
Joaquin Luna (center front row) and the staff of La Independencia in 1898

He was involved in the Philippine Revolution and served with the rank of colonel. Afterwards, he was La Union's representative to the Malolos Congress. La Union would later declare him as an adopted son years later. During the American occupation, he forwarded a collaborative stance and became associated with the group Asociacion de Paz as its treasurer that sought to establish cooperation with the colonizers by disengaging from anti-American revolt.

By 1904, he became governor of La Union and the representative of La Union's 1st legislative district during the 2nd and 3rd Philippine Legislature from 1910 until 1916.

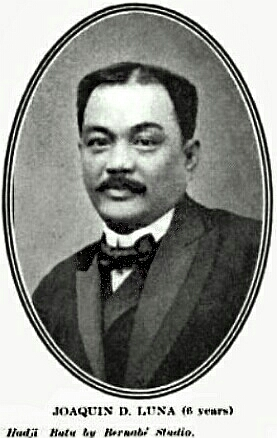
Luna depicted in a publication of Philippine Education, published April 1917

When he was appointed governor of the Mountain Province in 1916, succeeding E.A. Eckman, he was the first Filipino to hold such position. In the same year, he became Senator for the 12th senatorial district for the 4th Philippine Legislature that included Baguio, Mountain Province, Nueva Vizcaya, and the then Department of Mindanao and Sulu.

Through the Act of the Philippine Legislature No. 2623 that he authored and introduced in the Congress, he created the Conservatory of Music in the University of the Philippines on February 4, 1916.

In 1920, Luna resigned from the Senate when he was appointed as governor of Mountain Province once again. He served in this capacity until 1925.

== Death ==
Luna died on November 7, 1936, in Mountain Province at the age of 71.
