= Bauang =

Municipality in La Union, Philippines

- Municipality
- Municipality of Bauang
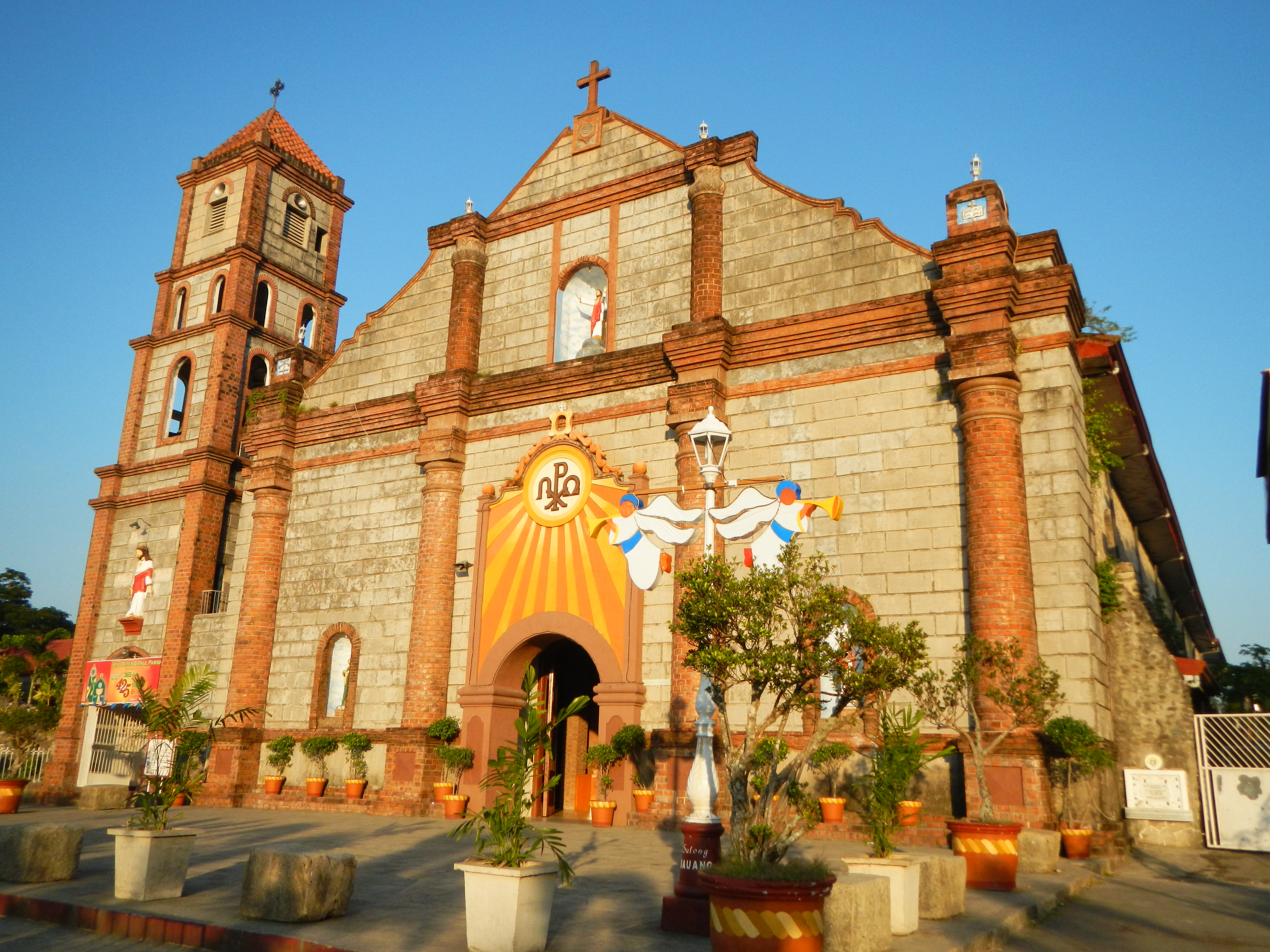
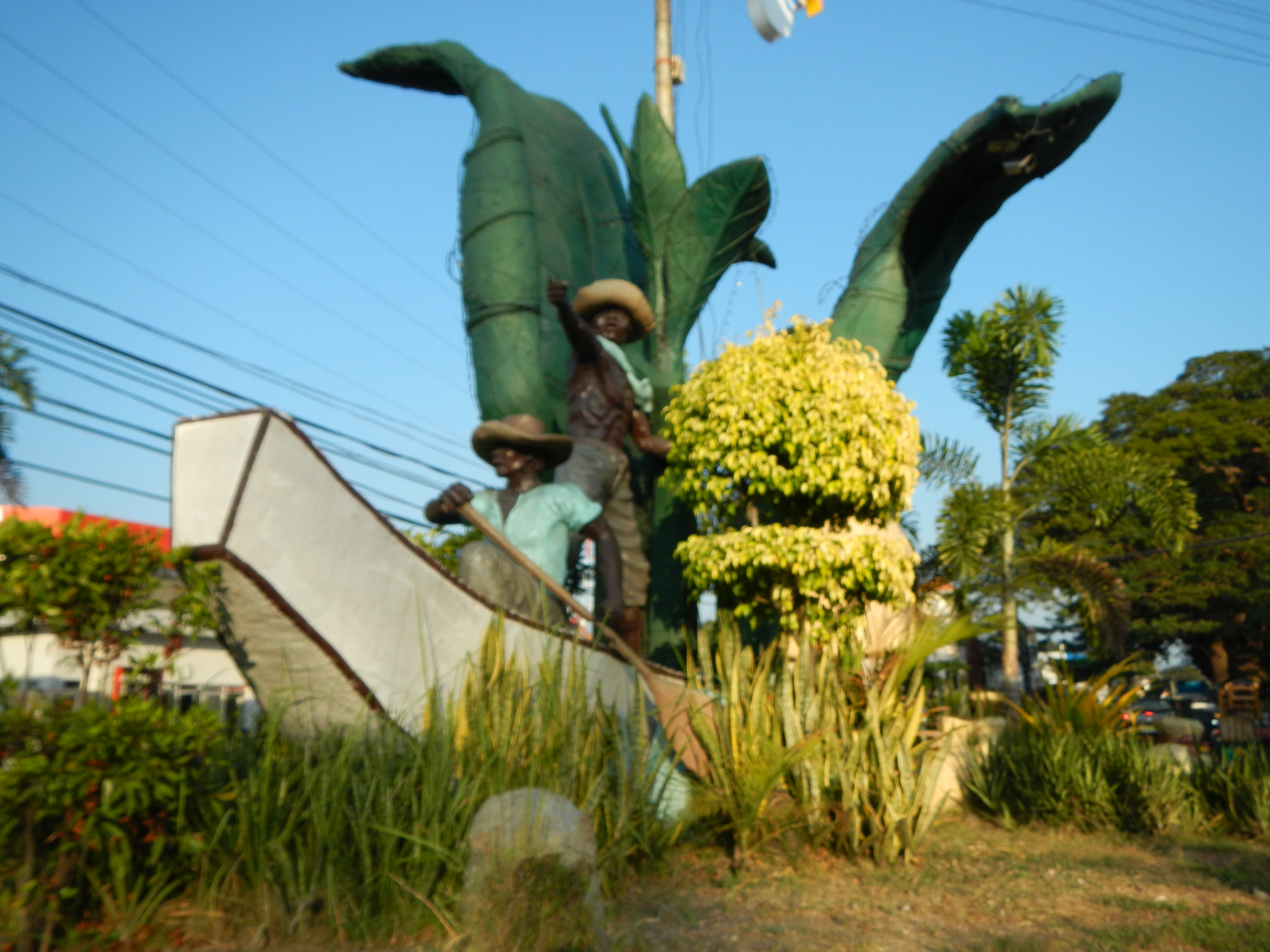
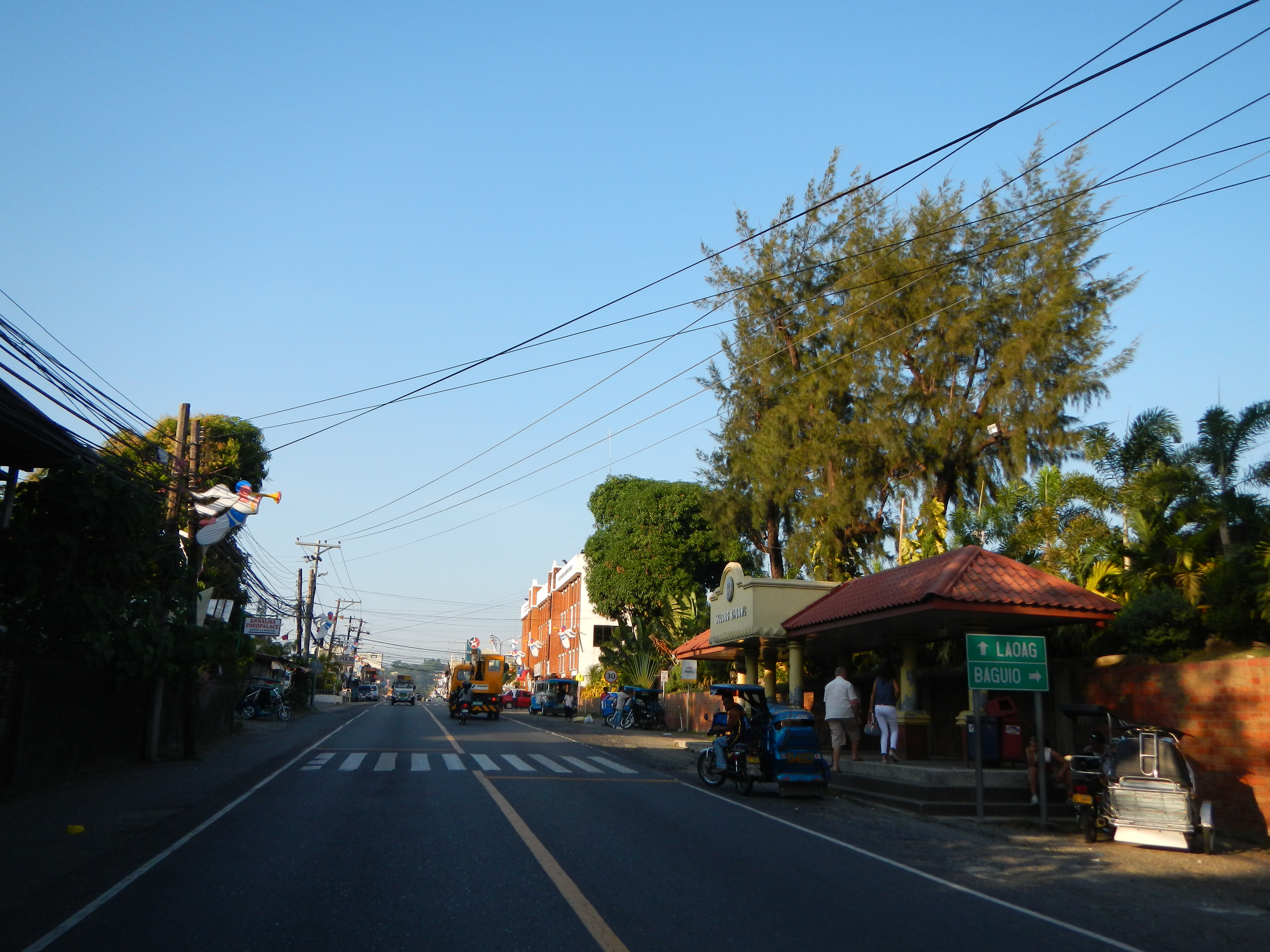
- Sts. Peter & Paul Parish Church, Farmers‑Fisher's Monument and Town Proper

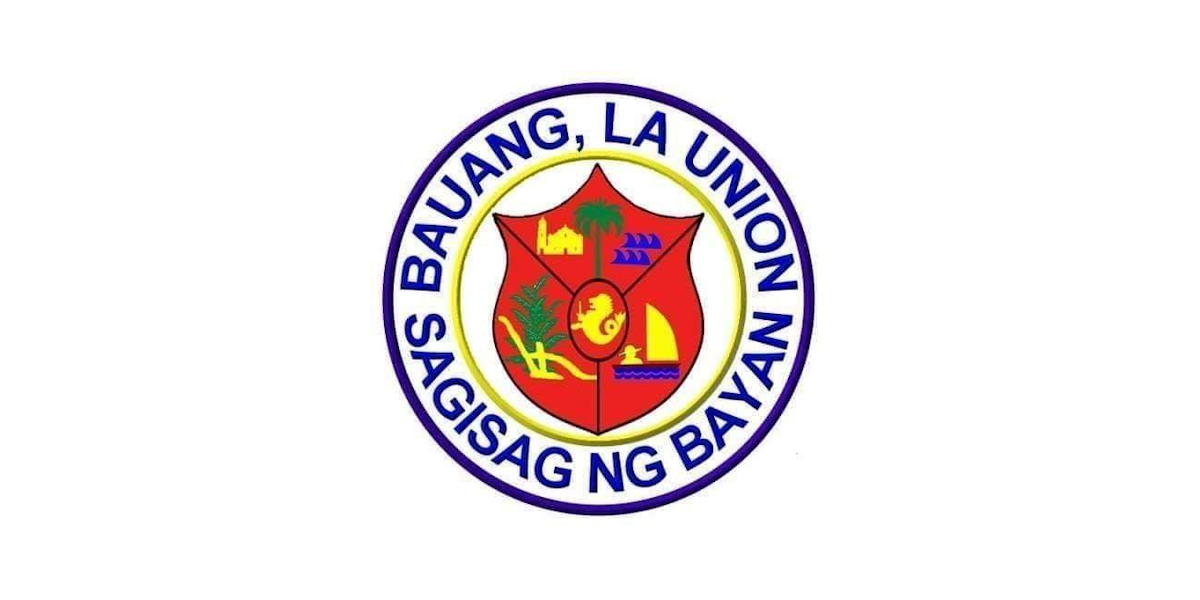
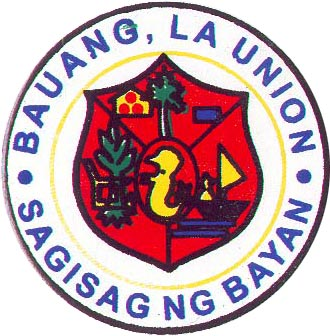
- Flag Seal
- Nicknames: Fruit Basket of the North
- Motto: Sulong Bauang 2030 and Vineyard City of the North by 2030
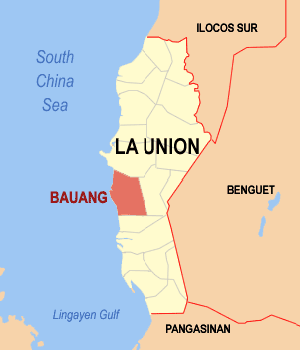
- Map of La Union with Bauang highlighted
- Interactive map of Bauang
- Location within the Philippines
- Coordinates: 16°32′N 120°20′E
- Country: Philippines
- Region: Ilocos Region
- Province: La Union
- District: 2nd district
- Founded: January 5, 1586
- Barangays: 39 (see Barangays)

Government
  - Type: Sangguniang Bayan
  - Mayor: Ma. Clarissa T. Lee
  - Vice Mayor: Tanya Roberta A. De Guzman
  - Municipal Council: Members: Raymond C. Ganaden; Ryan Andre M. Estigoy; Veronica T. Bernardo; Donny Ceazar D. Baradi; Gabriel A. Sotto; Bonifacio A. Malinao, Jr.; Felix P. Sanchez; Angelo S. Aquino
  - Electorate: 55,955 voters (2025)

Area
  - Total: 73.15 km^{2} (28.24 sq mi)
- Elevation: 41 m (135 ft)
- Highest elevation: 317 m (1,040 ft)
- Lowest elevation: 0 m (0 ft)

Population (2024 census)
  - Total: 77,670
  - Density: 1,062/km^{2} (2,750/sq mi)
  - Households: 19,796

Economy
  - Income class: 1st municipal income class
  - Poverty incidence: 7.69% (2023)
  - Revenue: ₱ 466.2 million (2024)
  - Assets: ₱ 1,920 million (2024)
  - Expenditure: ₱ 420.4 million (2024)
  - Liabilities: ₱ 430.2 million (2024)

Service provider
  - Electricity: La Union Electric Company (LUECO)
- Time zone: UTC+8 (PST)
- ZIP code: 2501
- PSGC: 0103307000
- IDD : area code: +63 (0)72
- Native languages: Ilocano; Tagalog
- Website: www.bauangtgis.gov.ph

Bauang, officially the Municipality of Bauang (Ilocano: Ili ti Bauang; Pangasinan: Baley na Bauang; Filipino: Bayan ng Bauang), is a municipality in the province of La Union, Philippines. According to the 2024 census, it has a population of 77,670 people.

The municipality is recognized as the "Fruit Basket and Beach Capital of the North," known for its pristine beaches, which remain a popular destination for swimming, as well as its cultivation of grapes and guapples.

In the annals of Philippine literature and history, Bauang holds significance as the birthplace of the renowned literary figure and World War II martyr, Manuel Arguilla. The municipality is strategically located along the MacArthur Highway, with a key junction connecting to Naguilian Road, one of the main routes leading to Baguio City.

== Etymology ==
The origins of the name "Bauang" are attributed to several interpretations. One theory suggests it comes from the word "buá" referring to the betel nut, which was plentiful in the area now known as Barangay Nagrebcan, where the old Spanish Church was constructed.

A more widely accepted explanation is that it derives from the Ilocano word for garlic “báwang or baoang”, which was also abundant at the time of the Spaniards' arrival. Another explanation links the name to the term "buang," meaning "river split into two," reflecting the town's geographical feature where the Bauang River divides into two branches before emptying into the sea.

== History ==
=== Early history ===
Bauang was a pre-colonial settlement located in the province of La Union, originally part of pre-colonial Pangasinan and referred to as Atuley, which now covers the present areas of Bauang, San Fernando, and San Juan.

The area was primarily inhabited by the Samtoys (Ilocano), along with smaller populations of Pangasinan. These settlers were mostly fisherfolk and traders, living in coastal communities that actively engaged in commerce with neighboring groups such as the Igorots, Tagalogs, and even foreign traders from Japan and China.

Commonly traded goods included gold, jars, silk, woven textiles, ceramics, and glass beads, reflecting the region's economic activity. Their belief system was rooted in animism, where natural objects and phenomena were considered to have spirits, guiding their cultural and religious practices.

=== Spanish Colonial Era ===
In 1572, following his successful conquest of Southern Luzon, Juan de Salcedo was directed by Miguel López de Legazpi to explore Northern Luzon and "pacify the people" there, as noted by Mendoza-Corte in the book Pangasinan: 1572-1800. At that time, the region was a thriving trading hub, especially known for its gold trade with Japanese and Chinese merchants. In June of that year, Legazpi arrived in Atuley, where he found the locals to be welcoming. He negotiated with them to pay tribute to the Queen of Spain, which they agreed to, though no permanent settlement was established. Salcedo then continued his journey toward Purao (now Balaoan) and Vigan.

By 1587, Augustinian friars had established towns along the coast, converting the locals to Christianity. These settlements were grouped together under the names “Baratao, Buratao, and Balitao.” Bauang became the center of the "ministerio" of Baratao and was initially placed under the patronage of Sts. Peter and Paul. The first priest of the Parish of the Chair of St. Peter was Fr. Miguel Sano, an Augustinian missionary. The parish was later renamed after its original patrons, Sts. Peter and Paul.

In 1590, Bauang was formally established as a settlement, with Fray Agustin Mino serving as its first minister. Like other towns in the region, Bauang endured devastating attacks from Moro pirates, known locally as “tirong.” These pirates often raided the town at night, killing residents, kidnapping women and children to sell as slaves, stealing cattle, and looting the town’s churches of valuable items.

These pirate invasions led to the construction of coastal watchtowers, known as baluarte, at strategic locations, including the mouth of the Bauang River. These towers served as fortresses to defend against the pirates and as refuges for locals who couldn’t escape to the hills. Today, only the foundations of these watchtowers remain.

In 1765, Bauang, along with neighboring towns, became part of the province of Pangasinan and was officially recognized as a town, with Don Francisco delos Reyes serving as its first gobernadorcillo. On March 2, 1850, La Union was established as a new province, and Bauang became one of its founding towns. Other towns that initially formed La Union included Santo Tomas, Agoo, Aringay, Caba, Naguilian, San Fernando, San Juan, and Bacnotan from Pangasinan, and Purao (now Balaoan), Namacpacan (now Luna), and Bangar from Ilocos Sur.

1898 Philippine Revolution

During the late Spanish colonial period, resistance to Spanish rule grew among the people of Bauang, largely due to colonial oppression and abuses. As the Philippine Revolution unfolded in the late 19th century, the people of Bauang joined the nationwide movement to gain independence from Spain.

Led by General Manuel Tinio y Bondoc, a revolutionary allied with Emilio Aguinaldo, locals in Bauang and nearby areas fought against Spanish forces in Northern Luzon. The town played a key role in the eventual expulsion of Spanish forces from La Union. Notable revolutionary leaders from Bauang, such as Remigio Patacsil and Mauro Ortiz, led the charge, contributing to the eventual victory of Filipino forces in the area.

=== American Colonial Era ===
Following the 1898 Spanish-American War, the Philippines was ceded to the United States under the Treaty of Paris. This marked the beginning of American colonization in the town and the wider province, bringing about significant political, economic, and social transformations under the new colonial administration. During the Philippine-American War, Bauang witnessed military conflicts as American forces sought to establish control over the area.

Once the Americans secured the province, they introduced democratic governance, leading to the election of La Union's first Civil Governor, Don Joaquín Joaquino Ortega, in 1901. This was a pivotal moment in local politics. However, by 1913, several of Bauang’s barrios, including Pagudpud, Pagdalagan, Sevilla, Bungro, Tanquigan, and Sibuan-Otong, were transferred to the jurisdiction of San Fernando.

==== Prominence of Manuel Arguilla ====
Bauang became well known in literary circles during the Commonwealth era because of the prominence of the writer Manuel Arguilla, who often drew inspiration from his upbringing in Bauang and the nearby countryside.

=== World War II ===
==== Japanese Invasion of Lingayen Gulf ====
Bauang, along with the nearby towns of Agoo and Caba were the first places the Japanese invasion force sought to control during the main effort to capture Luzon at the beginning of World War 2 - now known as the Japanese Invasion of Lingayen Gulf. Capturing the three towns which were connected by a high-quality road and protected on either side by naturally occurring geographical features meant that the Japanese forces were easily able to establish a secure beachhead. Once they had done so, they launched attacks against defense forces in San Fernando, La Union and Rosario, La Union, and from there deployed southwards across the plains of Pangasinan and Tarlac to take Fort Stotsenburg in Pampanga, then Bulacan, and finally Manila.

==== Resistance of Philippine and US forces ====
During the Pacific War, heroes of Bauang fought in its beaches, in Lingayen Gulf, Bataan and Corregidor (as USAFIP-NL).

The Japanese executed Manuel Arguilla, poet and journalist, Major Alberto O. Fenit (USAFFE), and Bauang Mayor Ambrosio Rimando. A town plaza monument today honors these Bauang heroes.

==== Retaking of Bauang ====
On March 14, 1945, the Allied Forces, along with guerillas and local inhabitants successfully captured the Bauang Bridges from the Japanese forces. The bridge was heavily guarded by the Japanese Army as it is the feasible route to Baguio, which the Japanese continued to hold as the city was virtually inaccessible from any ground attack. The capture of the two bridges is one of the more noted small unit actions of World War II.

=== Postwar Era ===
After the international recognition of Philippine independence in the wake of World War II, Bauang became known as the Beach Capital of the Philippines (1970, the shorelines of Baccuit Sur to Pagdalagan Sur). Bauang's Research Reef, a dive spot for local and foreign scuba divers, was recognized as a natural treasure.

=== Bauang from 1965 to 1986 ===
The beginning of the 1970s marked a period of turmoil and change in the Philippines because Ferdinand Marcos had used foreign debt to fund too many public works projects as he headed his 1969 reelection campaign, which led to the 1969 Philippine economic crisis and the First Quarter Storm protests. La Union residents mostly did not speak up about the economic stresses they were experiencing, but when Marcos declared martial law in 1972, Bauang was included with the rest of the country.

Marcos' efforts to consolidate political power did not get much resistance in the La Union, including Bauang, and La Union residents mostly did not speak up about the economic stresses they were experiencing. This was because Marcos took advantage of strong political ties to La Union, and allowed the powerful family factions (which had dominated La Union politics since before the American colonial era) to stay in place.

=== Later 20th Century ===
After Marcos fled into exile after the civilian-led 1986 People Power revolution, Manuel N. Sanglay was appointed OIC Mayor under the new Provisional Revolutionary Government. He was then properly elected into office when the Fifth Philippine Republic was established, serving until 1992.

In 1990, Bauang was heavily affected by the 1990 Luzon earthquake.

== Geography ==
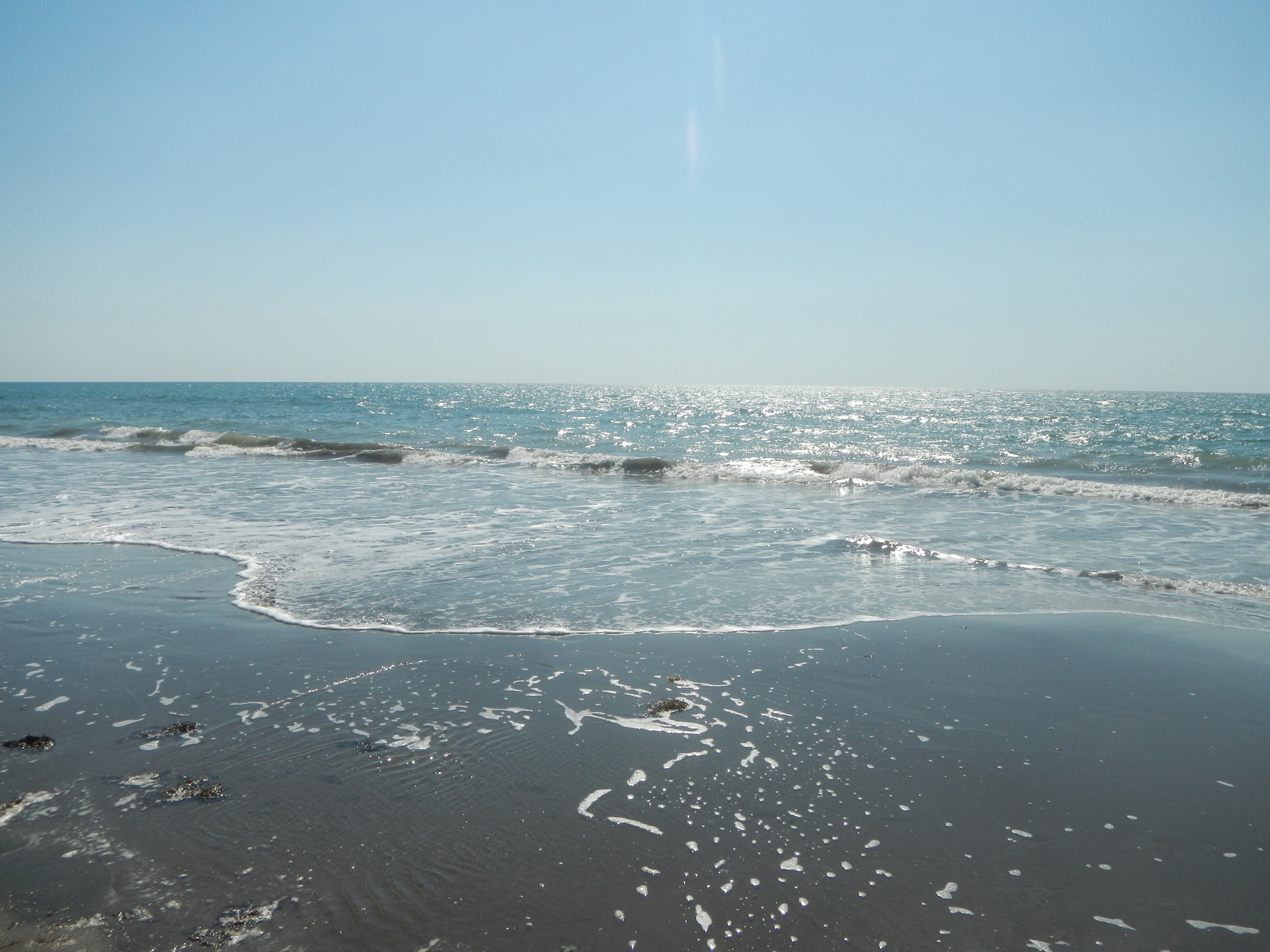
Taberna Beach, around Baranagay Bacquit or Taberna

The Municipality of Bauang is bordered to the north by the City of San Fernando, to the east by Naguilian, to the south by Caba, and to the west by the South China Sea. The municipality covers a total land area of 7,315 hectares, extending along the western coastline of the province. It is situated between longitudes 16° 20' to 16° 40' and latitudes 120° 30'. Bauang is also lying west of Baguio via Naguilian Road.

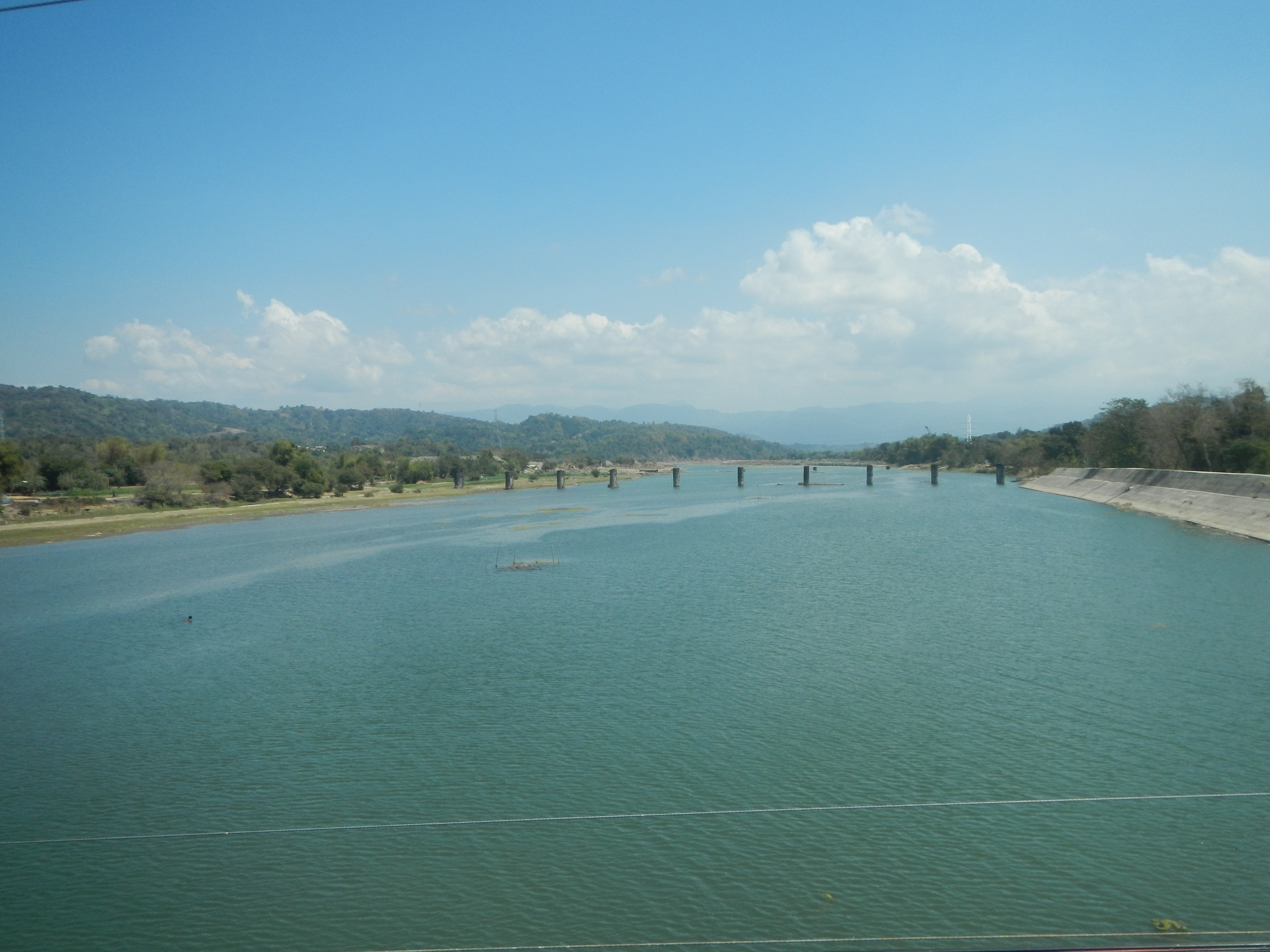
Bauang River aroung Barangay Nagrebcan

Out of Bauang's total area of 7,160 hectares, around 91.55 percent (6,555 hectares) is classified as alienable and disposable lands, while 8.4 percent (605 hectares) consists of public forestlands. These public forests can be found in the barangays of Sta. Monica, Cabalayangan, Ballay, and San Agustin. The protected forest area, characterized by slopes exceeding 50%, is estimated to cover 464 hectares. Bauang is classified as grassland or shrubland, featuring hilly and mountainous, forested terrain. The Balili (Bauang) River runs through the town and splits it with several creeks and streams.

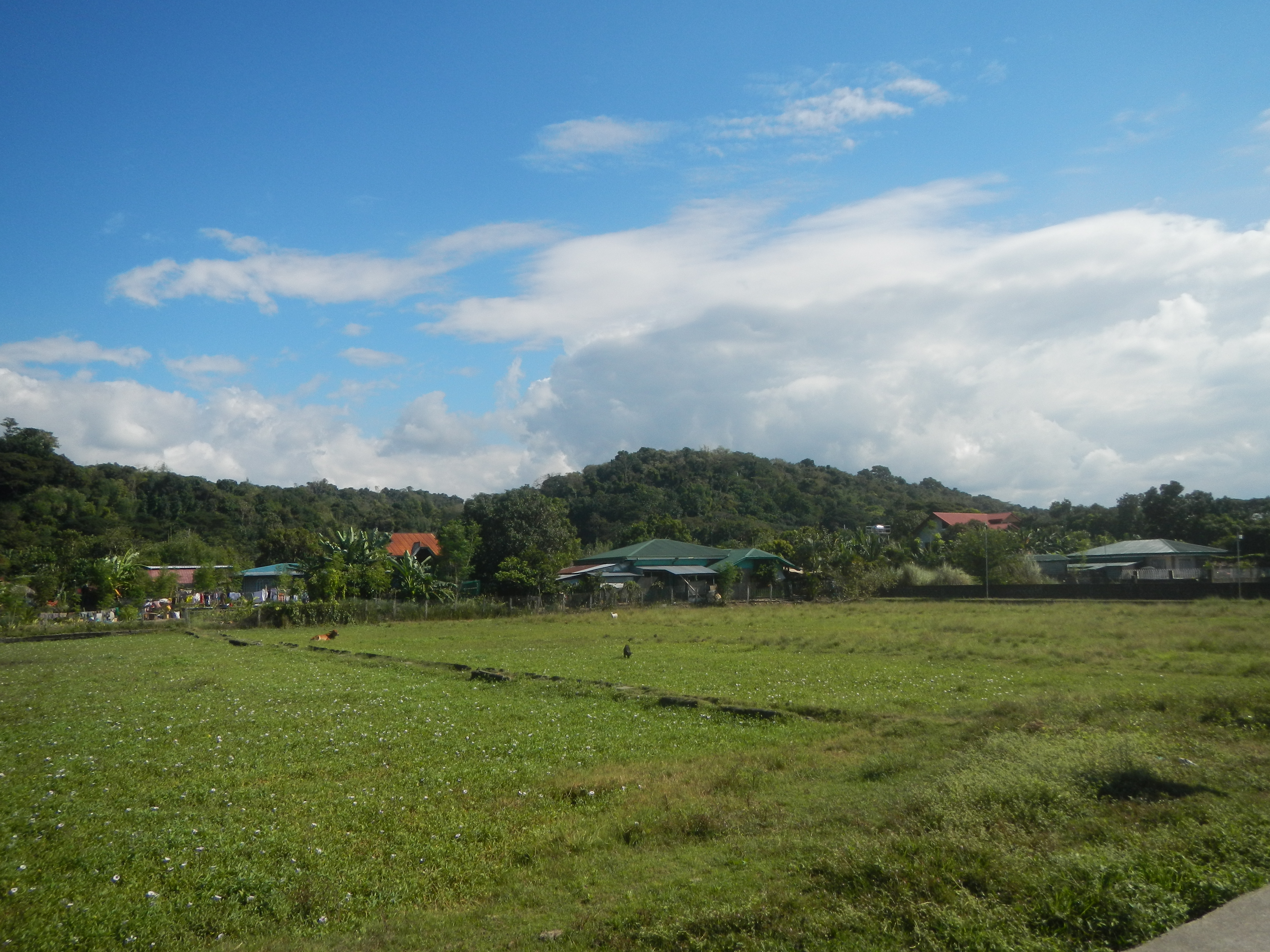
Grassland around Barangay Baccuit Sur

The town accounts for 4.90% of La Union's total land area of 149,309 hectares. Barangay Sta. Monica is the largest barangay, encompassing approximately 711 hectares, or 9.72% of Bauang's total area, followed by Barangay Casilagan (676 hectares), Upper San Agustin (470 hectares), Acao (444 hectares), and Cabalayangan (424 hectares). Conversely, Barangay Pilar is the smallest, covering roughly 17 hectares, with its area diminishing annually due to severe coastal erosion. Barangay Guerrero occupies 29 hectares, making up 0.040% of the municipality's total land area, along with other barangays such as Pagdalagan Sur (31 hectares) and Nagrebcan (34 hectares), both of which have areas below 50 hectares.

Bauang is situated 10.61 kilometres (6.59 mi) from the provincial capital San Fernando, and 256.61 kilometres (159.45 mi) from the country's capital city of Manila.

=== Barangays ===
Bauang is politically and administratively divided into thirty-nine (39) barangays, which are further subdivided into puroks, with some barangays also having sitios. According to the National Statistics Office (NSO), four (4) of these barangays are classified as urban: Calumbaya, Central East, Central West, and Quinavite. The remaining thirty-five (35) barangays are rural, and among them, fourteen (14) are coastal barangays. Each barangay is governed by a Chairman and a council of Councilors, while the Sangguniang Kabataan, represented by a Councilor, focuses on the representation and welfare of the youth in the community.

- Acao
- Baccuit Norte
- Baccuit Sur
- Bagbag
- Ballay
- Bawanta
- Boy-utan
- Bucayab
- Cabalayangan
- Cabisilan
- Calumbaya
- Carmay
- Casilagan
- Central East (Poblacion)
- Central West (Poblacion)
- Dili
- Disso-or
- Guerrero
- Lower San Agustin
- Nagrebcan
- Pagdalagan Sur
- Palintucang
- Palugsi-Limmansangan
- Parian Este
- Parian Oeste
- Paringao
- Payocpoc Norte Este
- Payocpoc Norte Oeste
- Payocpoc Sur
- Pilar
- Pottot
- Pudoc
- Pugo
- Quinavite
- Santa Monica
- Santiago
- Taberna
- Upper San Agustin
- Urayong

=== Climate ===
Climate data for Bauang, La Union
Month	Jan	Feb	Mar	Apr	May	Jun	Jul	Aug	Sep	Oct	Nov	Dec	Year
Mean daily maximum °C (°F)	30 (86)	31 (88)	33 (91)	33 (91)	32 (90)	31 (88)	30 (86)	30 (86)	30 (86)	31 (88)	31 (88)	31 (88)	31 (88)
Mean daily minimum °C (°F)	21 (70)	22 (72)	23 (73)	25 (77)	26 (79)	26 (79)	26 (79)	25 (77)	25 (77)	24 (75)	23 (73)	22 (72)	24 (75)
Average precipitation mm (inches)	42 (1.7)	48 (1.9)	74 (2.9)	110 (4.3)	269 (10.6)	275 (10.8)	362 (14.3)	325 (12.8)	330 (13.0)	306 (12.0)	126 (5.0)	61 (2.4)	2,328 (91.7)
Average rainy days	11.2	12.0	17.1	21.2	27.1	26.8	28.1	27.0	26.0	24.5	17.7	12.4	251.1
Source: Meteoblue

== Demographics ==
Population census of Bauang
Year	Pop.	±% p.a.
1903	10,032	—
1918	12,952	+1.72%
1939	16,304	+1.10%
1948	22,441	+3.61%
1960	26,142	+1.28%
1970	33,307	+2.45%
1975	37,917	+2.63%
1980	41,859	+2.00%
1990	51,573	+2.11%
1995	56,189	+1.62%
2000	63,373	+2.61%
2007	69,837	+1.35%
2010	70,735	+0.47%
2015	75,032	+1.13%
2020	78,449	+0.94%
2024	77,670	−0.24%
Source: Philippine Statistics Authority

As of the 2020 census, Bauang has a population of 78,449, representing 9.5% of the overall population of La Union. The population density is approximately 1,100 people per square kilometer (or about 2,800 people per square mile), with a calculated density of 1,035 individuals per square kilometer. Between 2015 and 2020, the population experienced an annual growth rate of 0.94%.

According to the Philippine Statistics Authority in 2020, the age distribution in Bauang is as follows: 26.5% of the population (20,692 individuals) are aged 0–14 years, 66.1% (51,721 individuals) are between the ages of 15 and 64, and 7.4% (5,796 individuals) are 65 years old or older. The gender breakdown shows 39,443 males and 38,766 females, with the largest age cohort being those aged 10–19 years, totaling 14,280 individuals.

=== Religion ===
About 92% of the population is Catholic, while 2% belong to the Iglesia ni Cristo denomination. The remaining 6% are affiliated with other religious groups.

=== Languages ===
The primary language spoken in Bauang is Iloco, though Tagalog, Pangasinan, and several other dialects are also used. While many residents have a good understanding of English, it is not frequently spoken in everyday conversations. In terms of literacy, an impressive 99.52% of those aged 10 and above are considered literate.

== Economy ==
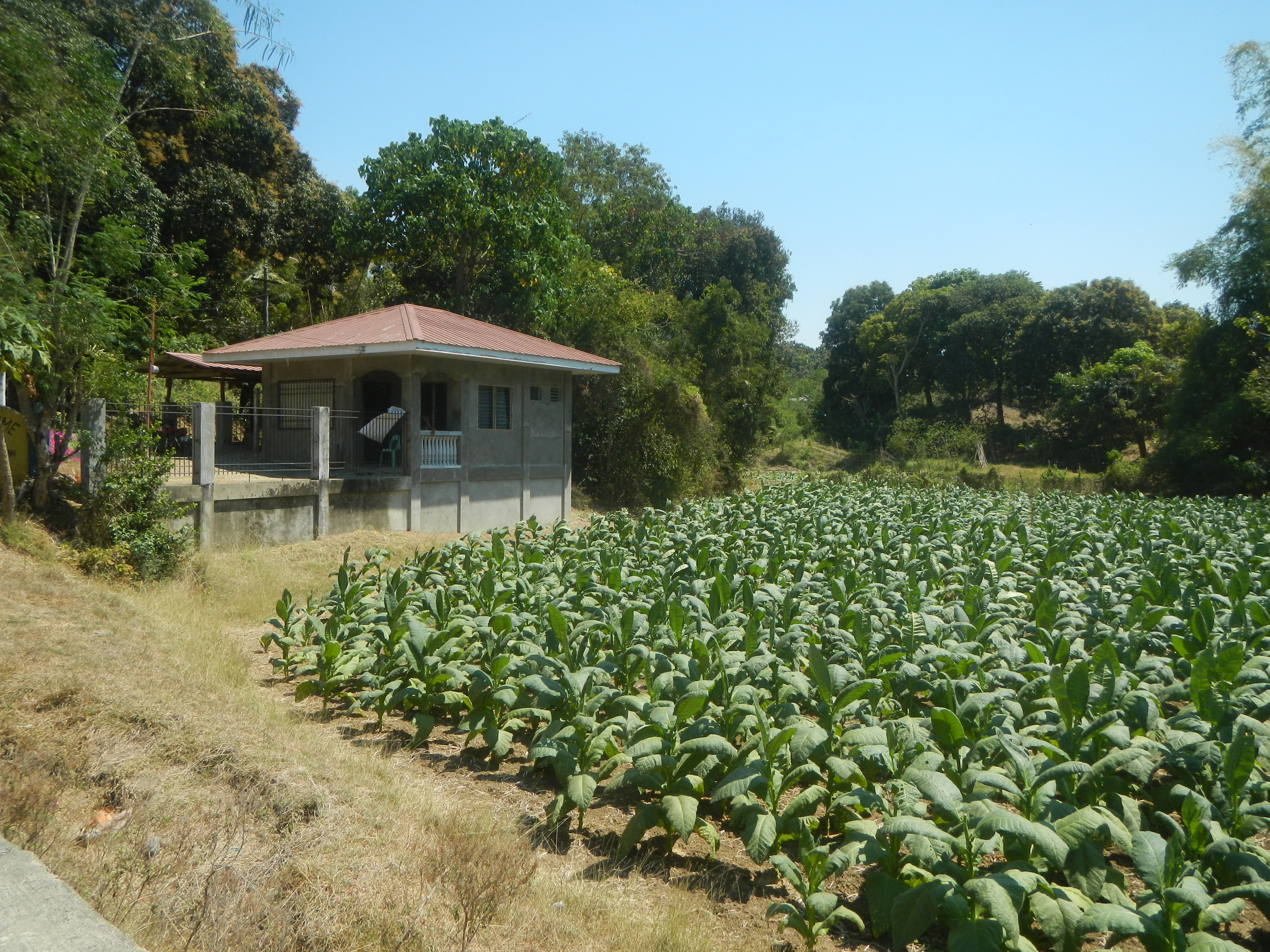
Tobacco field in Bauang

Bauang is primarily an agricultural municipality, with a large segment of its population relying on farming for their livelihood. Out of a total land area of 7,160 hectares, approximately 60%, or 4,302.09 hectares, is allocated for agricultural activities. However, the area available for lowland agriculture has been declining over time due to land conversion. Crop production is mainly focused on rice, cultivated over 1,722 hectares. A significant majority of the palay is grown in rainfed areas, accounting for 81.42%, while irrigated areas contribute only about 320 hectares.

Bauang has a poverty incidence of 7.5%, ranking it fourth among the municipalities in La Union with the lowest poverty rate.

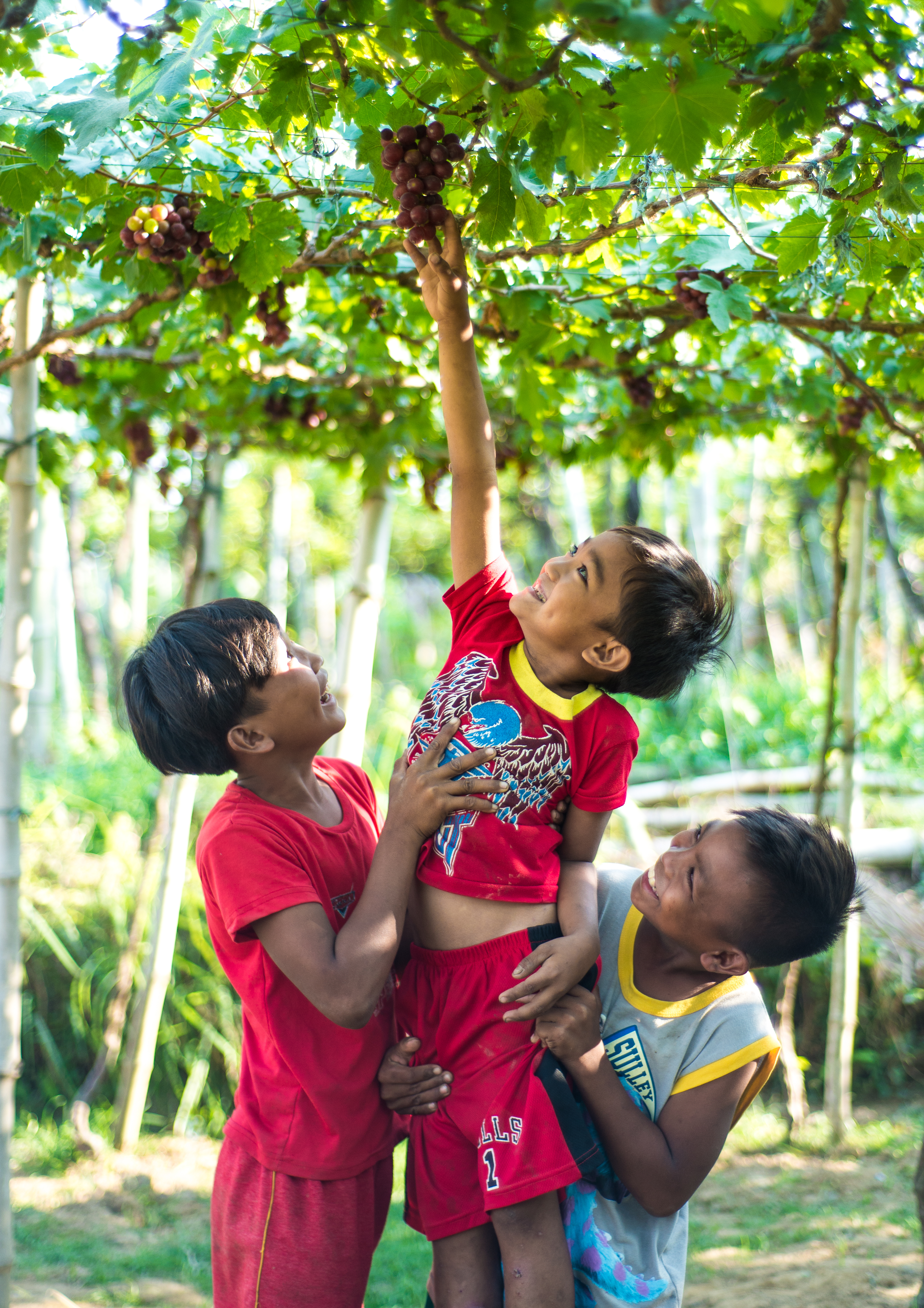
La Union Agri-Tourism Grape Farm

Bauang Beach, known for its fine grayish sand, is the primary tourist attraction in the region, stretching from Barangay Pagdalagan Sur to Barangay Baccuit. The shoreline is lined with several beach resorts, featuring approximately 12 key tourist accommodation facilities.

While there is no government hospital in the municipality, there is one Rural Health Unit (RHU), 11 Barangay Health Stations (BHS), and a clinic that provides maternity and geriatric care. Additionally, all 36 barangays have operational Barangay Health Centers, and health services are supplemented by five private medical clinics and 11 dental clinics.

The municipality has a reliable water supply for both residential and commercial use, provided by the Metro La Union Water District (MLUWD) and various water station establishments. Bauang enjoys full electricity coverage through LUELCO and LUECO, with the presence of the 1590 Energy Corporation and TransCo.

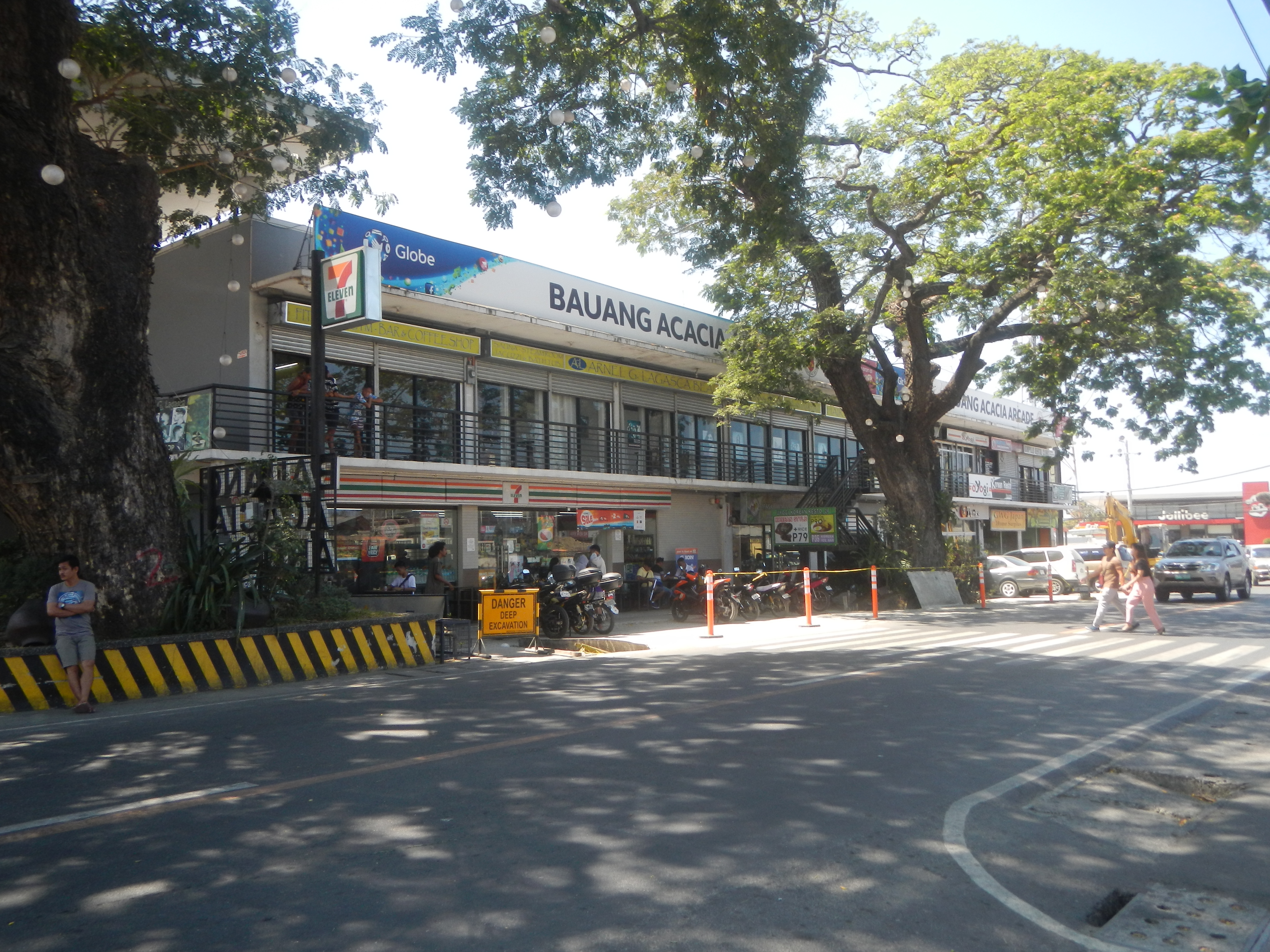
Bauang town proper

All 39 barangays are accessible via either paved or gravel roads, with two major national roads traversing the area: the Manila North Road (McArthur Highway) running north to south and the Naguilian Road heading east to west toward Baguio City. The municipality is equipped with advanced communication infrastructure, including digital landlines, cable services, internet providers, and cell towers.

In terms of education, Bauang has 28 elementary schools and 9 secondary schools (comprising six public and three private institutions) distributed across 24 barangays. Only one institution offers tertiary education. The teacher-to-student ratio and classroom-to-student ratio at the elementary level meet the standard of 1:45, indicating sufficient resources. However, at the secondary level, a classroom-to-student ratio of 1:50 suggests a need for additional classrooms.

Poverty incidence of Bauang

Source: Philippine Statistics Authority

== Tourism ==
=== Festivals and local events ===
Date	Name
January 5	Foundation Anniversary
Holy Week	Electric Fluvial Parade (Stations of the Cross)
April (First Friday)	Kalgaw Summer Beach Sports Festival
June 29	Patronal Fiesta (Sts. Peter and Paul)
First Saturday of October	OktoberFest
October 31	Panagkakararua Festival
December 16 to January 5	Baggak Festival

The natives, who are predominantly Catholic, speak Ilocano, Filipino, and English. The primary industries are farming, fishing, power plant, and quarrying.

Bauang's main products are rice, corn, guapples and native grapes (barangays Payocpoc, Santiago, Bagbag, and Urayong), mango, lowland vegetables, livestock, tobacco, marine products, saltwater fish politically.

Guapple by-products are also sold in Bauang: bread, buchi, chunky, cocktail, cookies, cupcake, dried, empanada, espasol, flan, guinataan, gulaman, inipit, jam, jelly, juice, kutsinta, pastilles, maja, marmalade, oatmeal, pie, yema, polvoron, preserved, rolls, siopao, tarts, turrones, macaroons, bars, and fingers as pasalubongs.

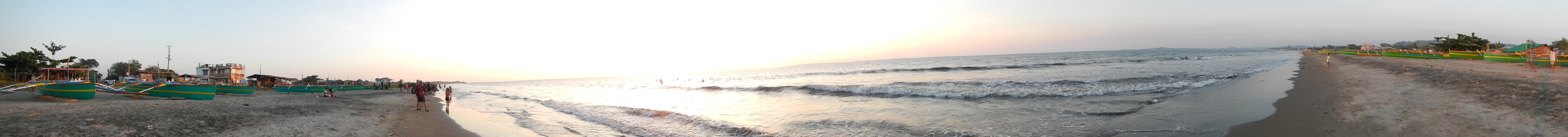
Panorama of Bauang beach at Barangay Taberna

=== Beaches and sunsets of Bauang ===
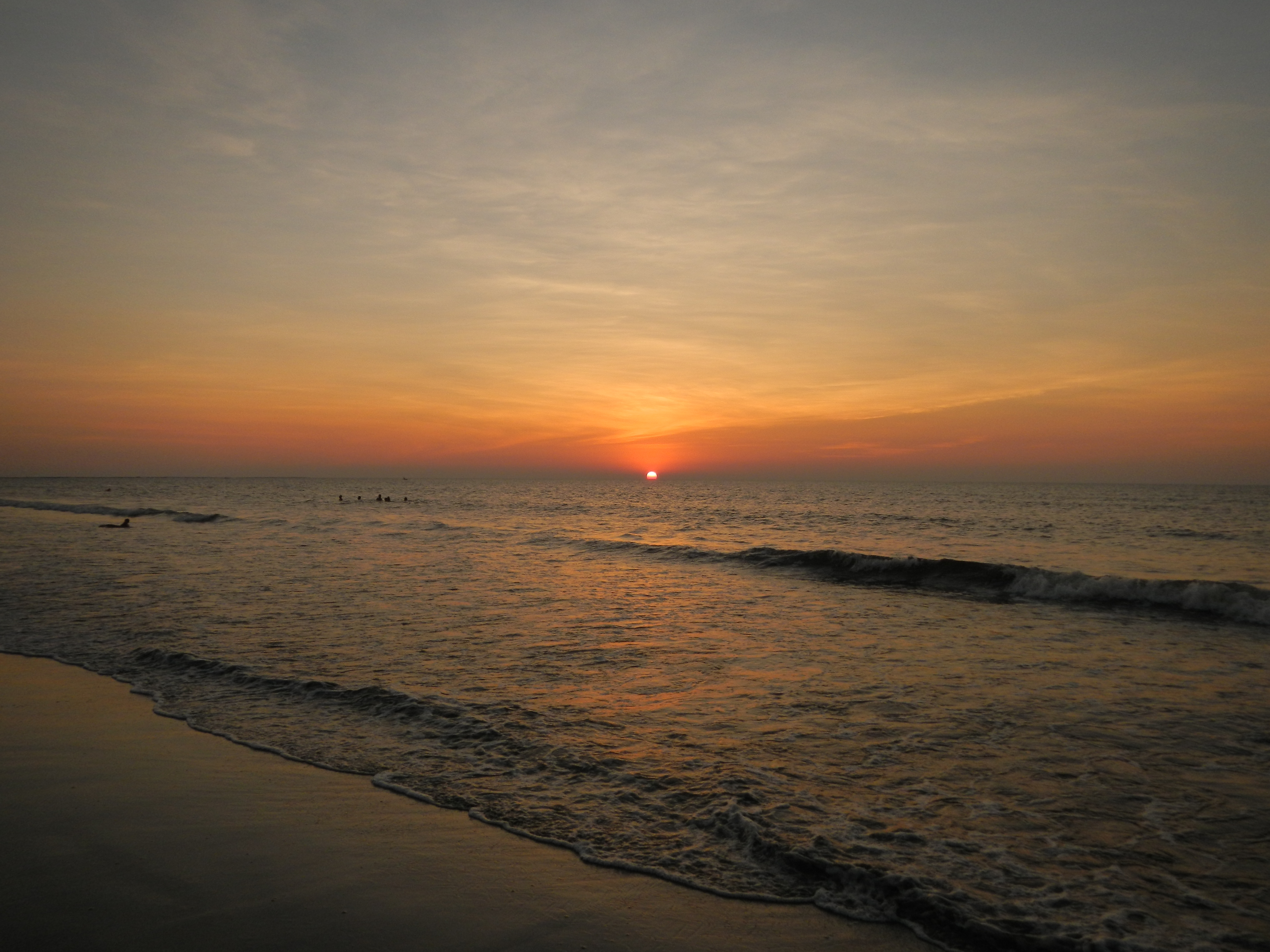
Bauang sunset

Bauang is known for its fine-sand beaches, that stretches on the coast of Barangay Taberna, Baccuit Sur and Norte, Paringao, and Pagdalagan Sur beaches.

Bauang's beaches are accessible from several resorts: Bali Hai Beach Resort (Paringao), Long Beach Resort, Coconut Grove Beach Resort and San Luis del Mar (Baccuit Norte), inter alia.

=== Manuel Arguilla commemorations ===
Among Philippines literary circles, Bauang has become a pilgrimage site of sorts for celebrating the life of and works of writer and World War II martyr Manuel Arguilla, with writers visiting the author's hometown to experience the landscapes that inspired him, and which featured prominently in his stories.

The most prominent event celebrating Arguilla was the 2017 run of the Taboan Literary Festival, a celebration of Philippine literature which changes venues every year, organized by the National Commission on Culture and the Arts during every National Arts Month in February. Among the prominent artists who came to the festival to celebrate Arguilla were writer-academic Butch Dalisay and National Artist of the Philippines Bienvenido Lumbera.

The ancestral house where Arguilla grew up is still standing at Barangay Nagrebcan in Bauang, bearing a historical marker put in place by the National Historical Commission of the Philippines.

=== Saints Peter and Paul Parish Church ===
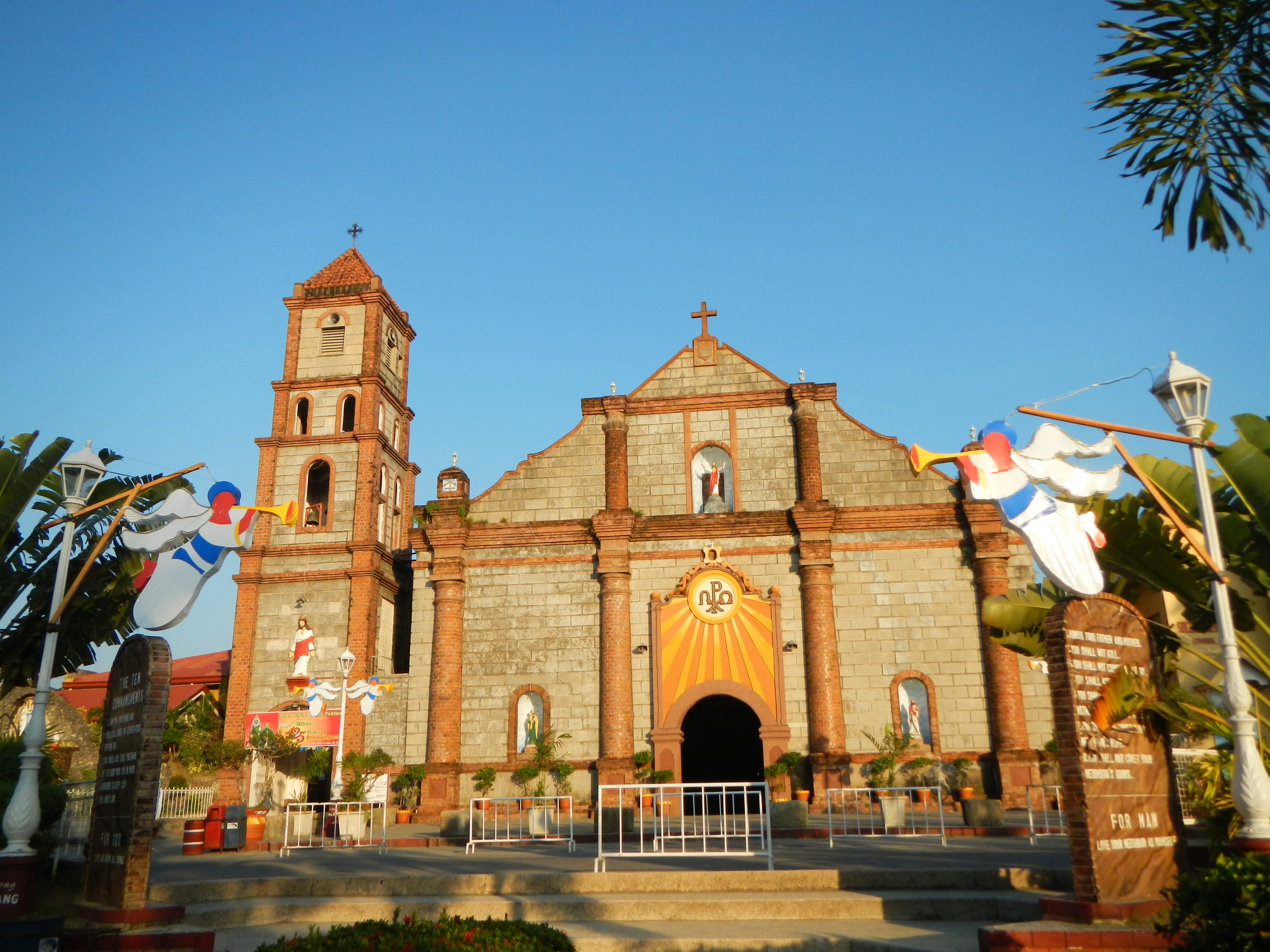
The 1587 Sts. Peter and Paul Parish Church

The Sts. Peter & Paul Parish Church (canonically erected on April 25, 1587, by the Augustinian missionaries) celebrates its fiesta every June 29. It is under the jurisdiction of the Diocese of San Fernando de La Union (Dioecesis Ferdinandopolitana ab Unione, Suffragan of Lingayen – Dagupan, which was created on January 19, 1970, and erected on April 11, 1970, comprising the Civil Province of La Union, under the Titular, St. William the Hermit, February 10). It has been headed by the Most Rev. Rodolfo F. Beltran, D.D., bishop since January 18, 2013. The Church is under a diocese of the Latin Church of the Catholic Church in the Philippines from the Archdiocese of Nueva Segovia. The Church is also under the pastorship of Rev. Fr. Perpetuo Concepcion. Its Parochial Fiesta is on April 26.

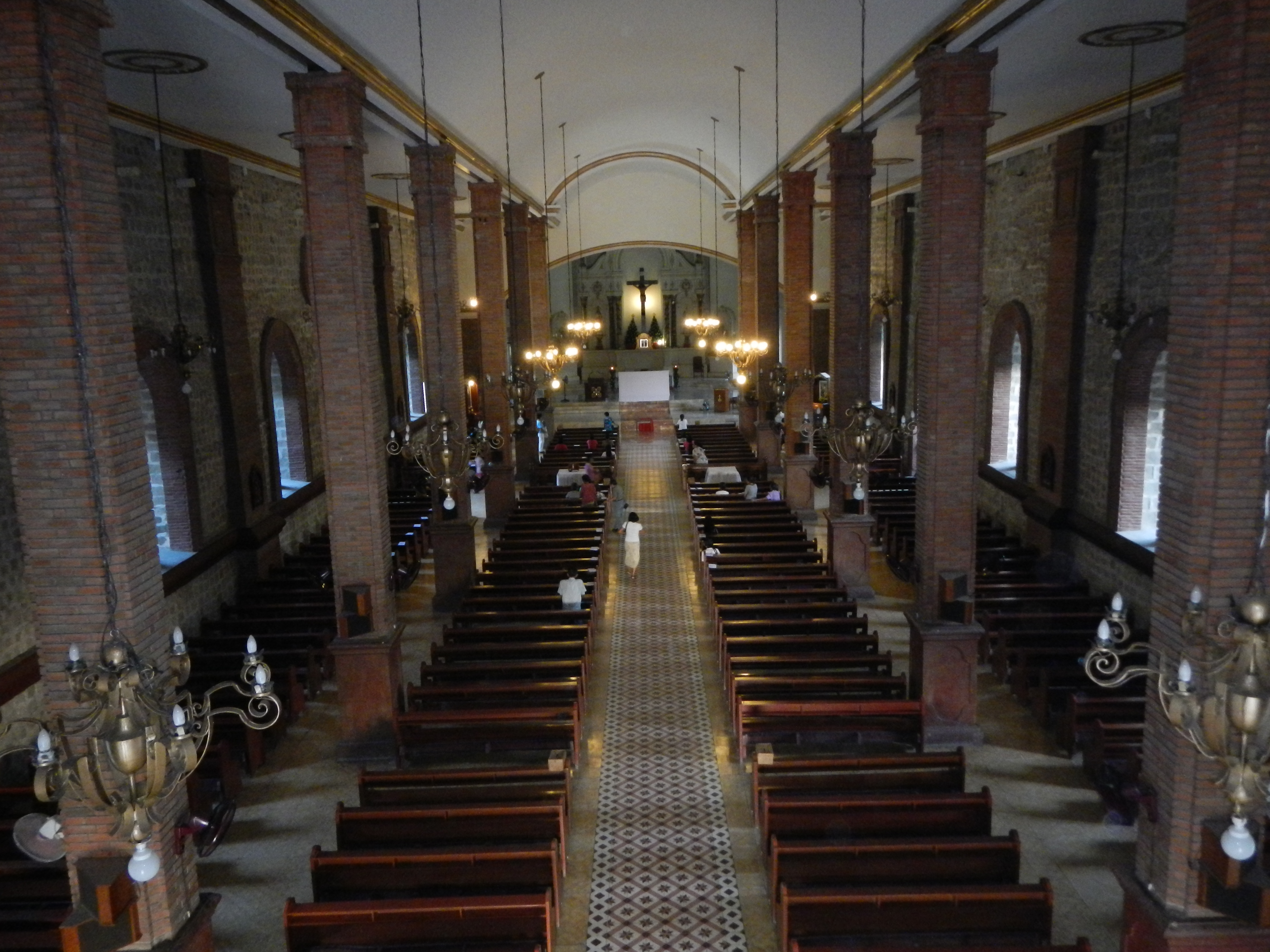
Interior of Sts. Peter & Paul Parish Church

The Saints Peter and Paul Church is one of the oldest churches in the Philippines. Damaged by the 1892 earthquake, the Church was restored in 1895. Damaged again in 1944, the stone convent was destroyed in 1955. The Sacred Heart School now stands from the old Convent.

The Church has a rectangular four-storey bell tower (with two bells, restored with cement and hollow blocks in 1973). The Church interior was painted in 1978. The July 16, 1990, quake destroyed the facade which was later rebuilt. In 1901 US Army's (then) Lt. Col. Thomas Barry, who was chasing Emilio Aguinaldo during the Philippine–American War, took the bell as a "token souvenir" and later gave the bell to his alma mater, the United States Military Academy at West Point, New York, where it was housed for over a century. The bell was ceremoniously returned to the Philippines in May 2016 to be reinstalled in the Peter and Paul Church.

The Grotto of Our Lady of Lourdes is at the foot of the Church.

==== 400-year old San Pedro Bell ====
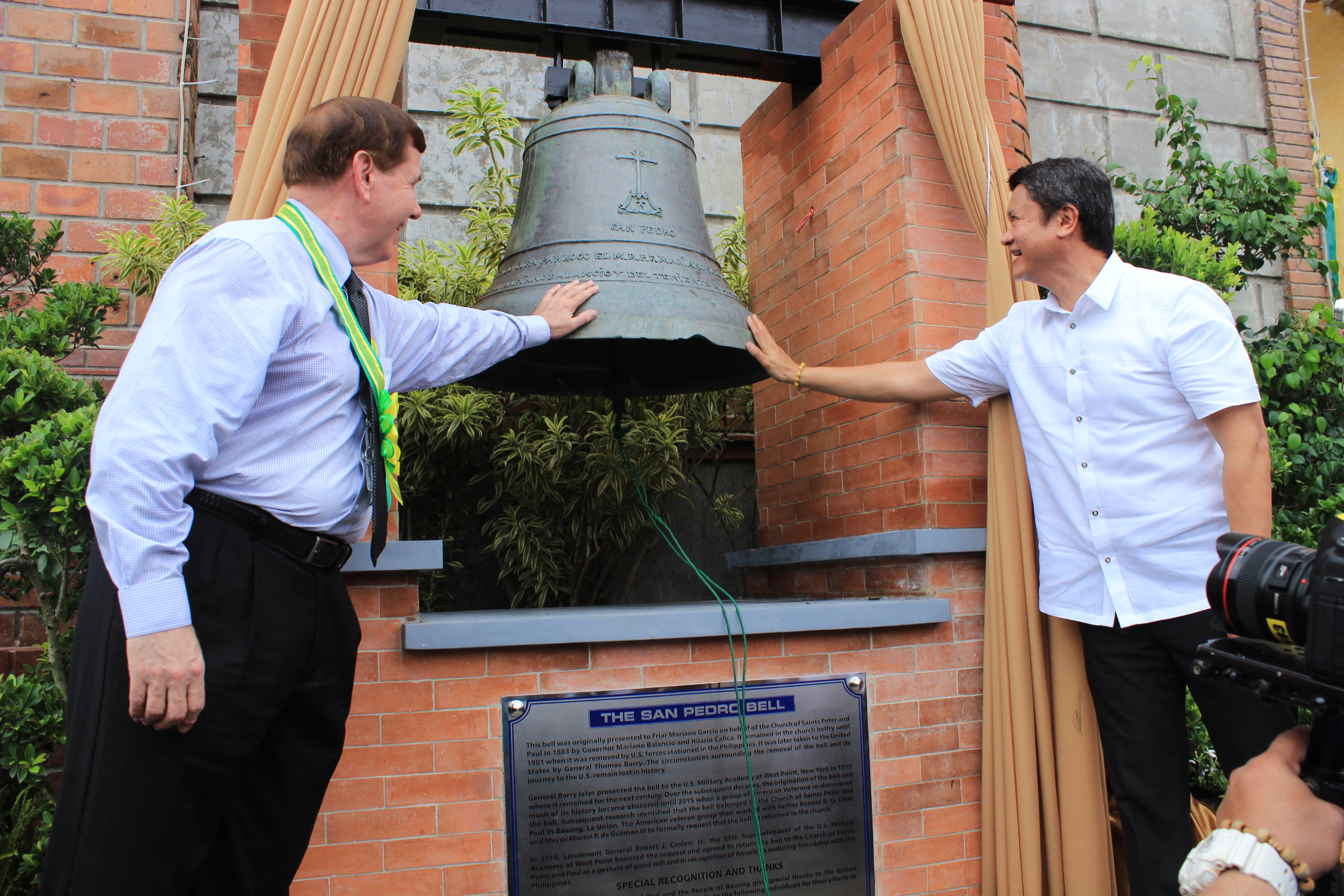
San Pedro Bell Returned to Bauang on May 23, 2016

On May 23, 2016, the 400-year old "San Pedro" bell made from alloy of gold, silver, and copper was returned to the Saints Peter and Paul Parish Church, after American soldiers during the Philippine–American War in 1901 took it from the church to West Point Academy in New York.

== Government ==
=== Local government ===
Just as the national government, the Bauang's municipal government is divided into three branches: executive, legislative, and judiciary. The judicial branch is administered solely by the Supreme Court of the Philippines. The LGUs have control of the executive and legislative branches.

The executive branch is composed of the mayor and the barangay captain for the barangays. The legislative branch is composed of the Sangguniang Bayan (town assembly), Sangguniang Barangay (barangay council), and the Sangguniang Kabataan for the youth sector.

The seat of Government is vested upon the Mayor Eulogio Clarence Martin P. De Guzman III who holds office since June 30, 2022, at the Bauang Town Hall. The Sangguniang Bayan is the center of legislation.

=== Elected officials ===
Members of the Municipal Council (2025-2028)
Position	Name
Representative, La Union 2nd Legislative District	Dante S. Garcia
Mayor	Ma. Clarissa "Manang Bong" T. Lee
Vice-Mayor	Tanya Roberta A. de Guzman
Sangguniang Bayan Members	Raymond C. Ganaden
Sangguniang Bayan Members	Ryan Andre "Rayray" M. Estigoy
Sangguniang Bayan Members	Veronica T. Bernardo
Sangguniang Bayan Members	Donny Ceazar D. Baradi
Sangguniang Bayan Members	Gabriel A. Sotto
Sangguniang Bayan Members	Bonifacio "Kit" A. Malinao, Jr.
Sangguniang Bayan Members	Felix P. Sanchez
Sangguniang Bayan Members	Angelo "Bong" S. Aquino
Sangguniang Bayan Members	Edgar B. Beninsig (ABC President)
Sangguniang Bayan Members	Rich Carlo A. Barnachea (SKF President)

== Infrastructure ==
1590 Energy Corporation The Bauang Diesel Power Plant formerly owned by the Bauang Private Power Corporation (BPPC) is a diesel-fired power plant that commenced operations in July 1995 with a 215 MW-capacity. State-owned National Power Corporation and the First Private Power Corp. (FPPC) entered into a Build-Operate-Transfer Agreement for the BPCC for a period of 15 years.

On July 26, 2010, after the BOT expiration, it was turned over to the NAPOCOR and the Power Sector Assets and Liabilities Management Corp. (PSALM) and later to the Provincial Government of La Union. Both Viviant Energy Corporation and Gigawatt Power, Inc. under the 1590 Energy Corp. operates the Bauang power facility provide the additional supply to the Luzon grid.

Major facilities inside the plant include a substation, two 100,000 bbl steel fuel storage tanks, sludge treatment plant, and five auxiliary buildings consisting of an administration building (812 sq.m), maintenance building (981 sq.m), warehouse building (591 sq.m), guest house (583 sq.m), bunkhouse (660 sq.m), and a canteen (550 sq.m).

The world's largest medium-speed power station in Bauang maintains an IMS certification for ISO 9901:2000, ISO 14001:2004, and OHSAS 18001 from Certification International.

PLDT Asia-Pacific Cable Network (APCN) in Baccuit Sur A Digital Optical Cable System for telecommunications services linking Hong Kong, Indonesia, Japan, Korea, Malaysia, Taiwan, Thailand, Singapore, and the Philippines is strategically located at the coastline barangay of Baccuit Norte in Bauang, La Union.

The facility, owned by the Philippine Long Distance Telecommunications Company, aims to benefit the users of telecommunications services and consequently stimulate the rapid expansion of business and government intercourse between the Philippines and the foreign countries to be served.

== Education ==
There are two schools district office which govern all educational institutions within the municipality. It oversee the management and operations of all private and public elementary schools and high schools. These are Bauang North Schools District Office, and Bauawang South Schools District Office.

=== Primary and elementary schools ===
- Acao Elementary School - Barangay Acao
- Baccuit Elementary School - Barangay Baccuit Sur
- Bagbag Elementary School - Barangay Bagbag
- Ballay Elementary School - Barangay Ballay
- Baratao Elementary School - Sitio Baratao, Barangay Acao
- Bauang North Central School - Barangay Central East
- Bawanta Elementary School - Barangay Bawanta
- Bigbiga Elementary School - Sitio Bigbiga, Barangay Lower San Agustin
- Boy-Utan Elementary School - Barangay Boy-Utan
- Bucayab Elementary School - Barangay Bucayab
- Cabalayangan Elementary School - Barangay Cabalayangan
- Calumbaya Elementary School - Barangay Calumbaya
- Casilagan Integrated School - Barangay Casilagan
- Guerrero Elementary School - Barangay Guerrero
- Palugsi-Limmansangan Elementary School - Barangay Palugsi-Limmansangan
- Parian Este Elementary School - Barangay Parian Este
- Parian Oeste Elementary School - Barangay Parian Oeste
- Paringao Elementary School - Barangay Paringao
- Payocpoc Elementary School - Barangay Payocpoc Sur
- Pudoc Primary School - Barangay Pudoc
- Pugo Elementary School - Barangay Pugo
- Quinavite Elementary School - Barangay Quinavite
- Saint Anthony Montessori Educational Network, Inc. (Private) - Barangay Central East
- Saints Peter and Paul Learning Center (Private) - Barangay Central East, beside the Church
- San Agustin Elementary School- Barangay Upper San Agustin
- Santiago Elementary School - Barangay Santiago
- Santa Monica Elementary School - Barangay Santa Monica

=== Secondary schools ===
- Baccuit National High School - Barangay Baccuit Sur
- Ballay National High School - Barangay Ballay
- Bawanta National High School - Barangay Bawanta
- Casilagan Integrated School - Barangay Casilagan
- Don Eulogio de Guzman Memorial National High School - Barangay Calumbaya
- Eulogio Clarence de Guzman Junior Memorial National Vocational HS (formerly Acao National High School) - Barangay Acao
- Paringao National High School - Barangay Paringao
- Sacred Heart School (Private) - Barangay Central East
- Saint Anthony Montessori Educational Network, Inc. (Private) - Barangay Central East

=== Higher educational institutions ===
- La Union Colleges of Science and Technology (Private) - Barangay Central West
- Saint Louis College Development Center (Private)

== Bauang in literature ==
Bauang, specifically Barangay Nagrebcan on the shores of the Balili River, features prominently in the works of Philippine literary icons Manuel Arguilla and F.Sionil Jose.

== Notable personalities ==
- Manuel Arguilla, one of the Philippines' most influential English writers, grew up in Bauang's Barrio Nagrebcan
- Bernabe de Guzman, Filipino senator from 1919 to 1925

== Gallery ==
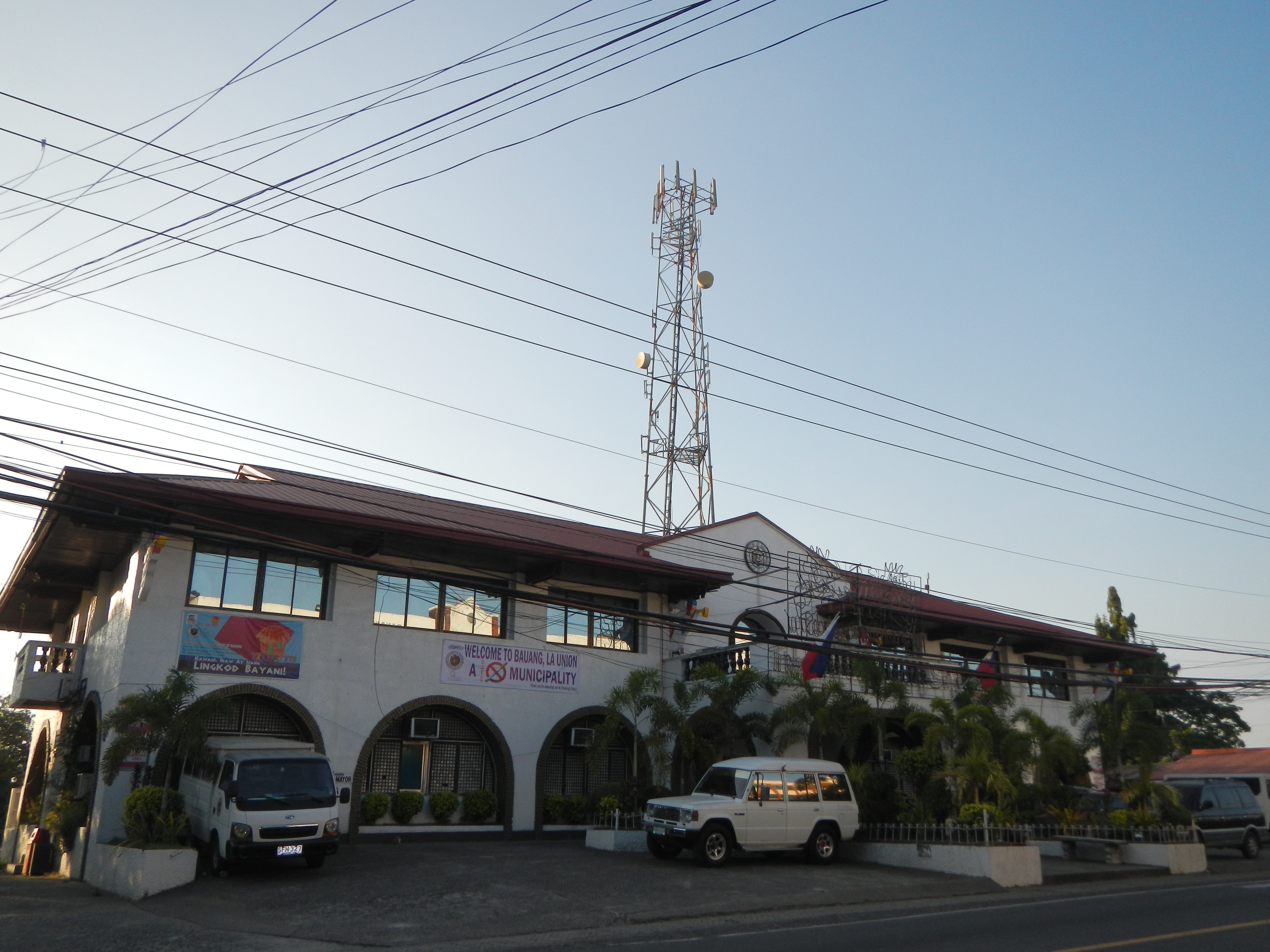
Municipal hall

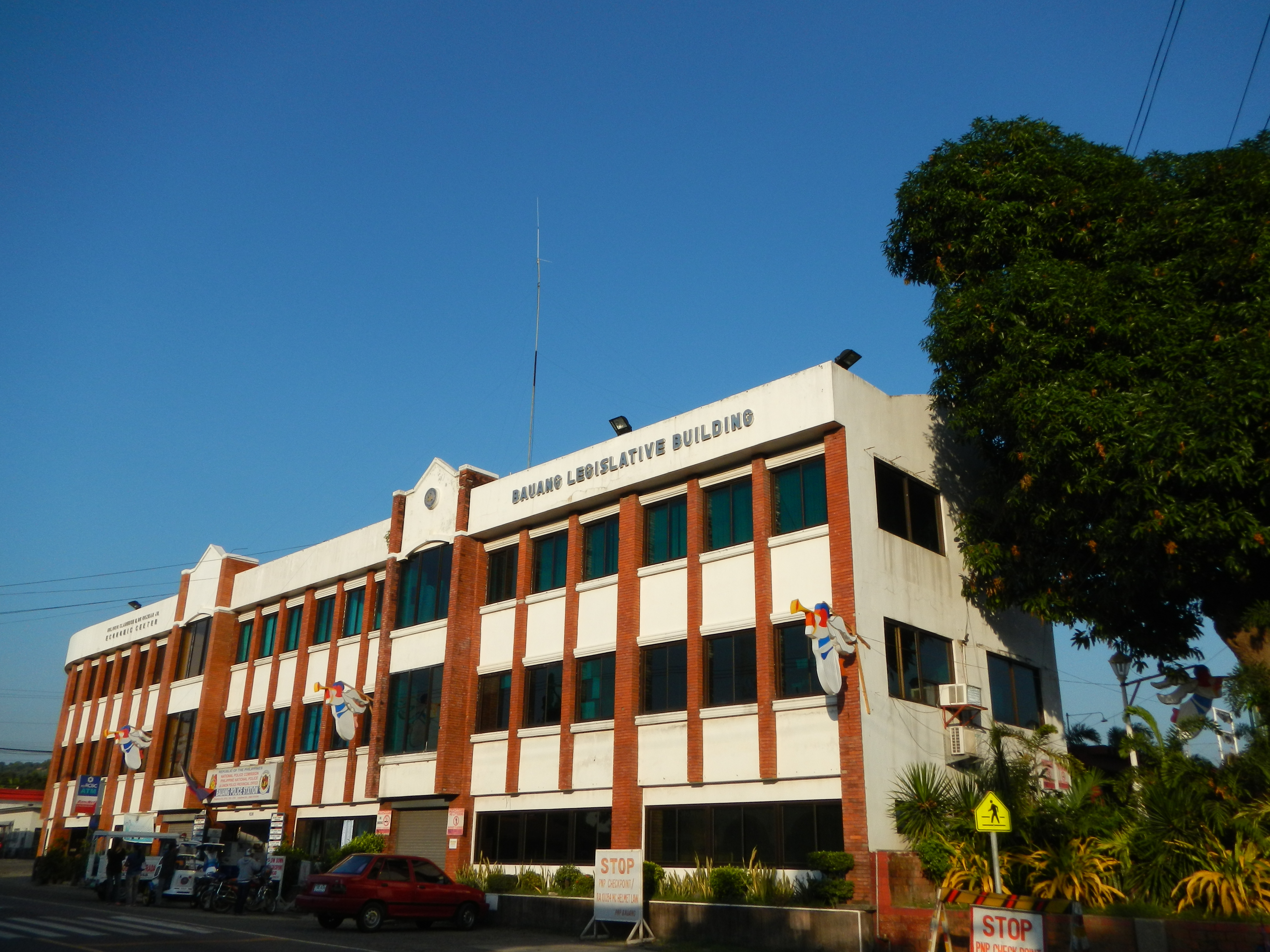
Police station and Legislative building

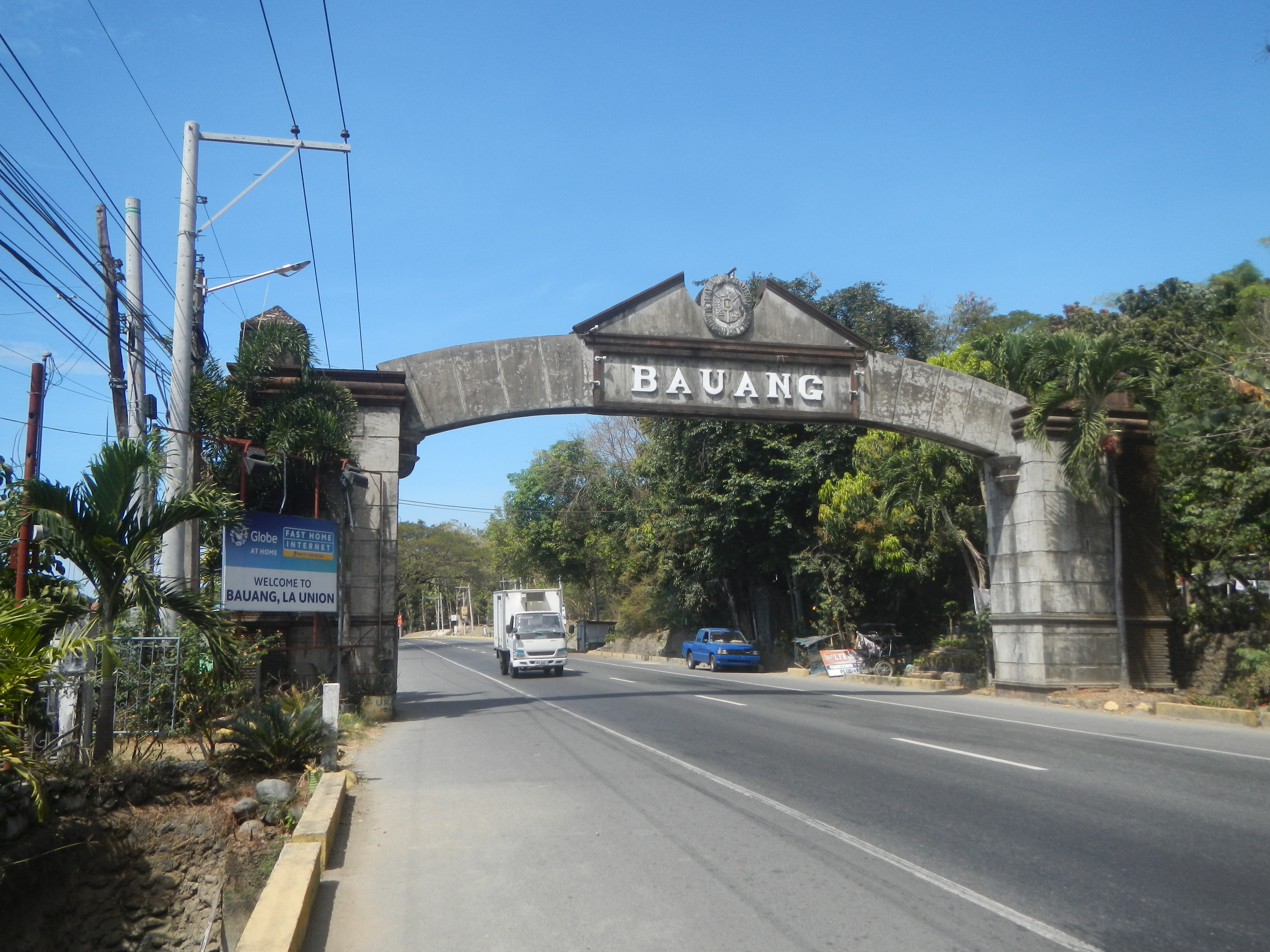
Bauang Welcome Arch

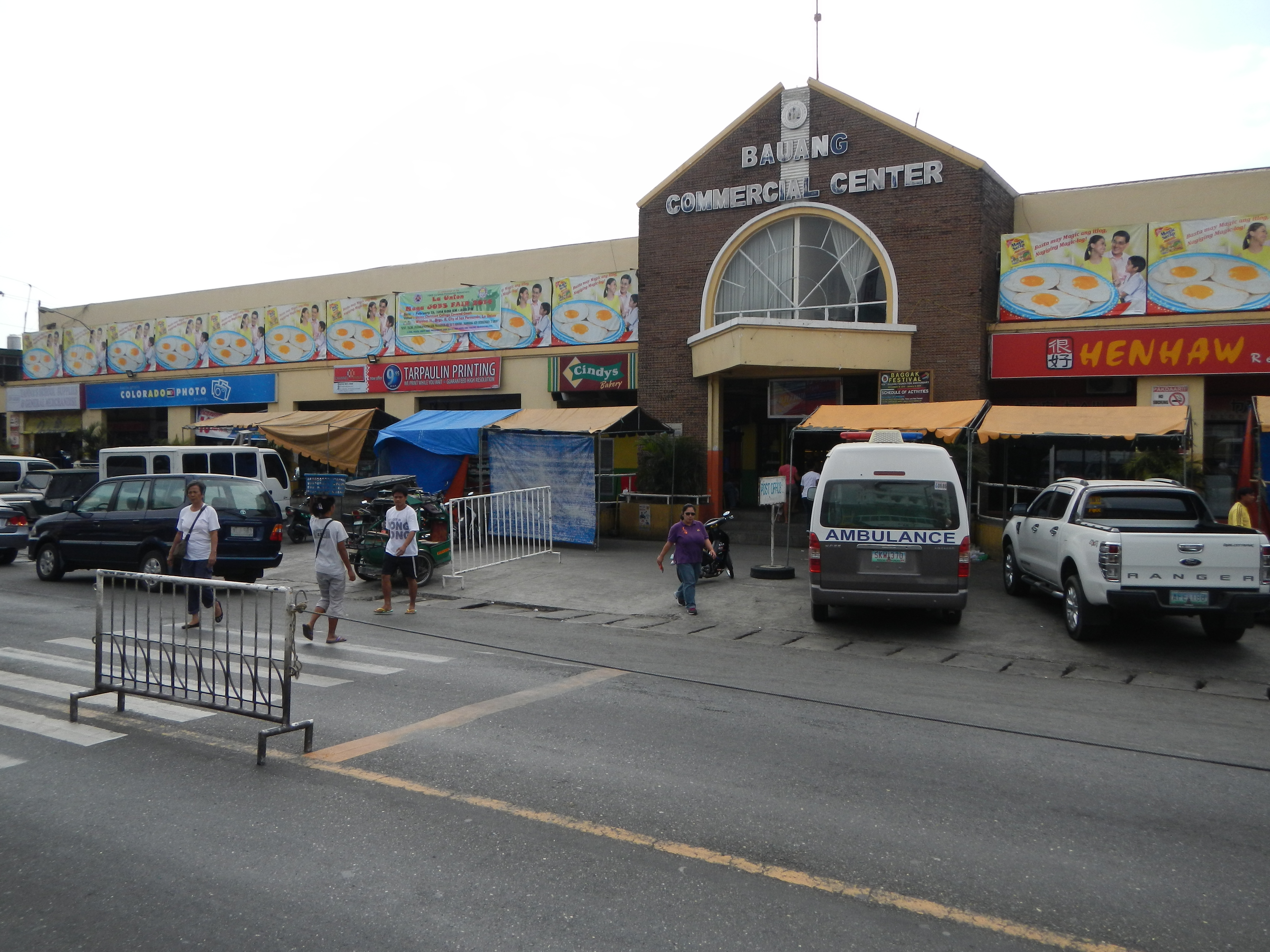
Bauang Commercial Center (public market)

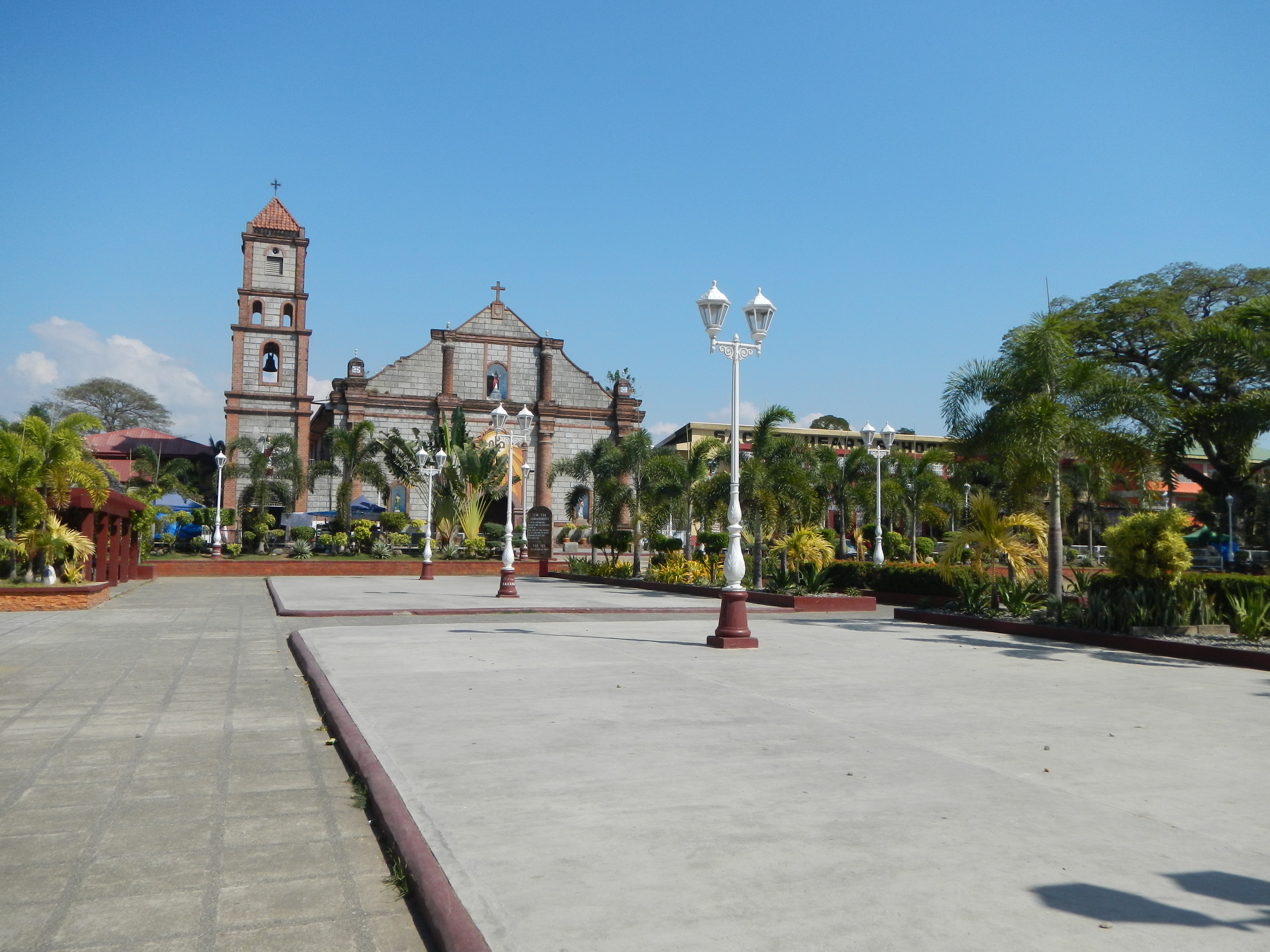
Town plaza overlooking Sts. Peter & Paul Parish Church

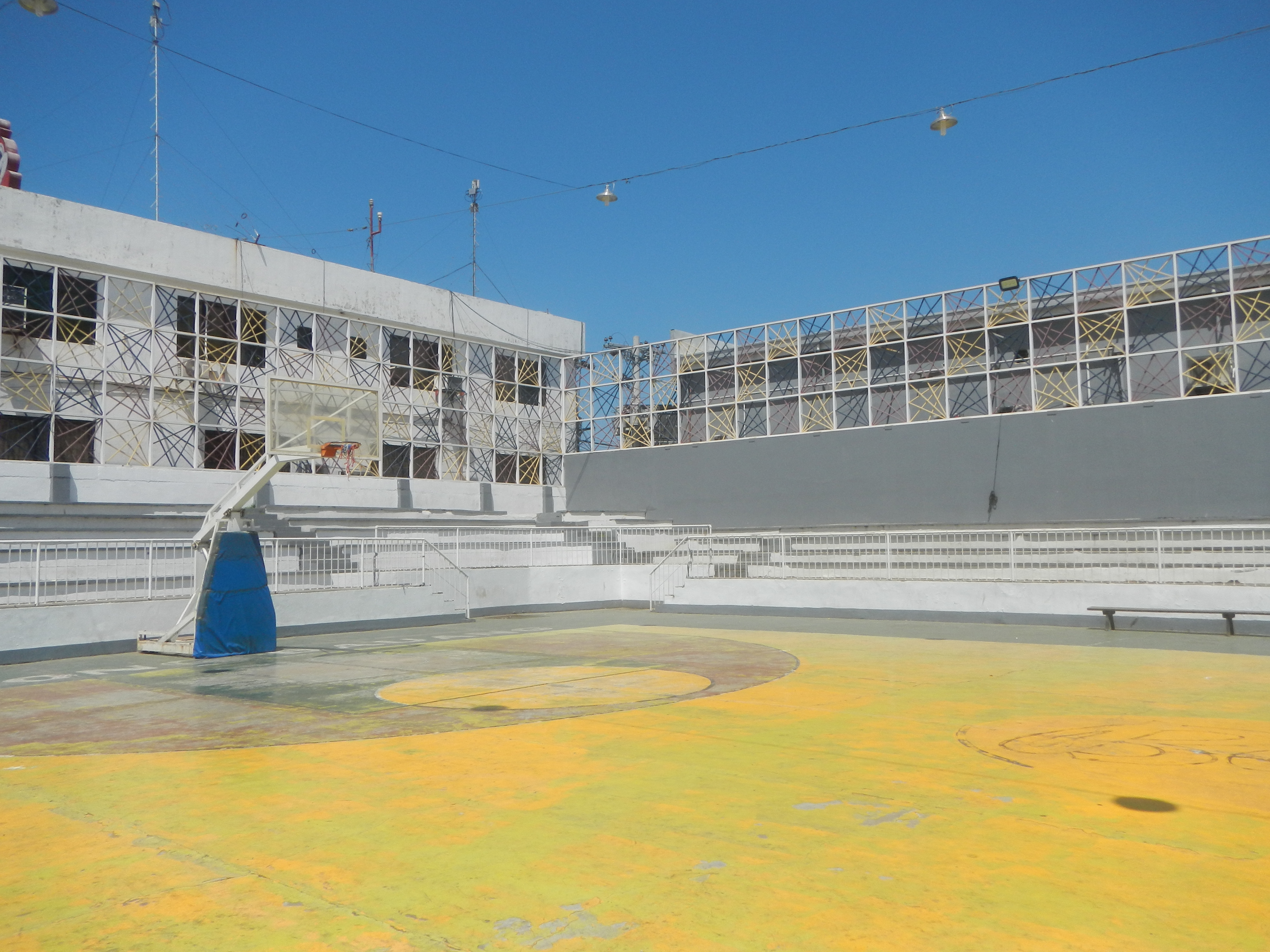
Bauang Town Plaza

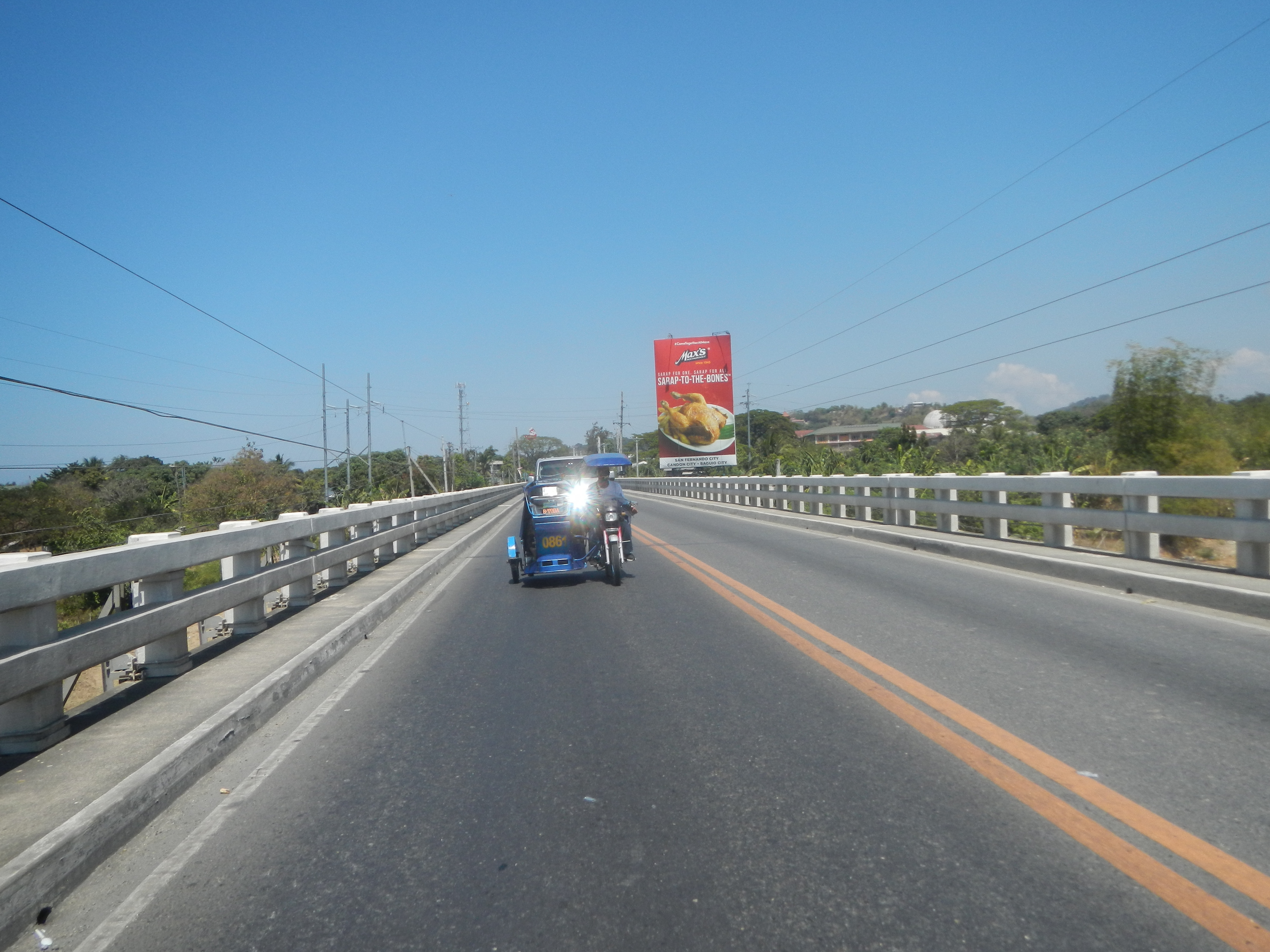
Bauang Bridge

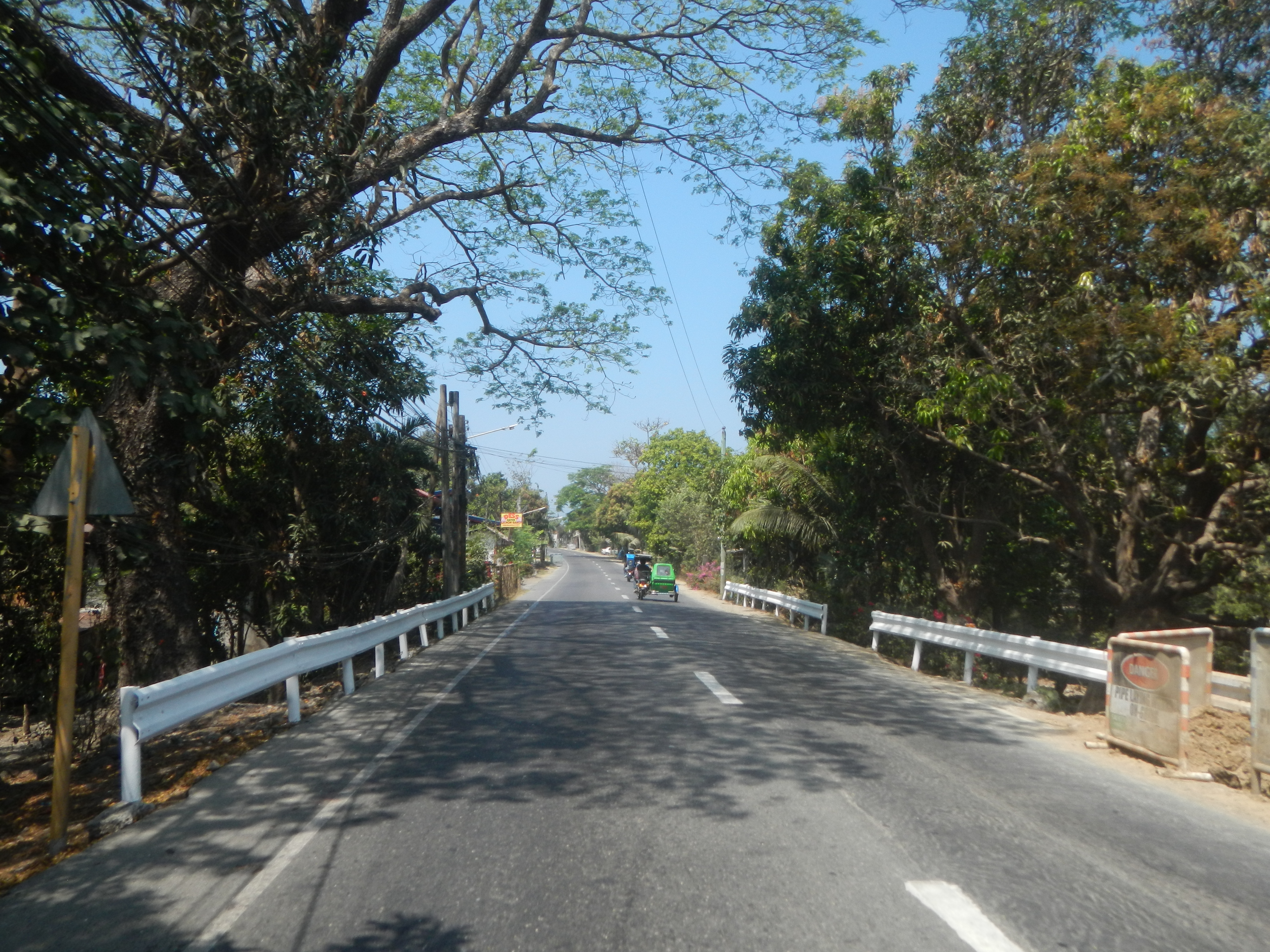
Along Naguilian Road, Bauang

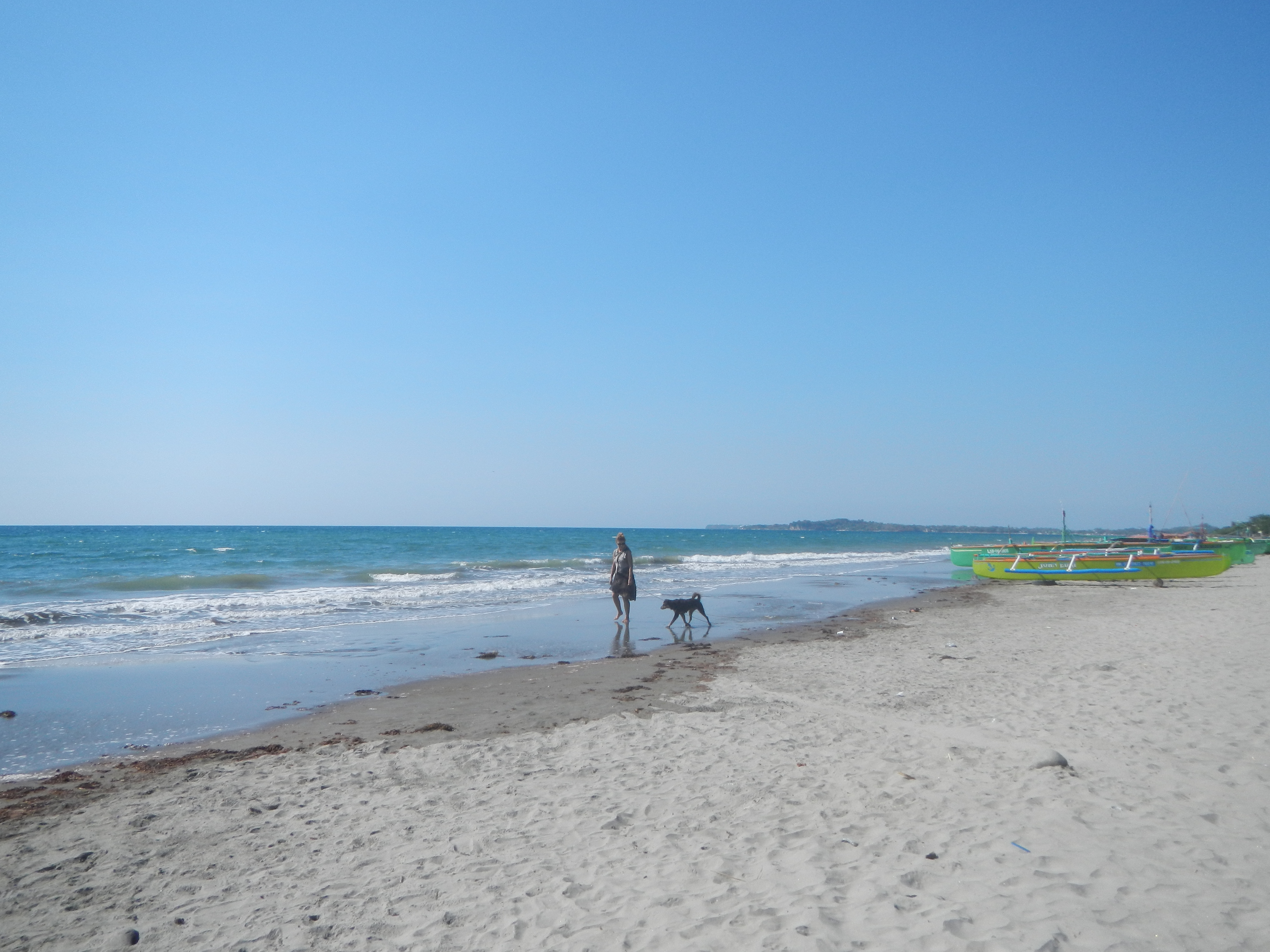
Taberna Beach

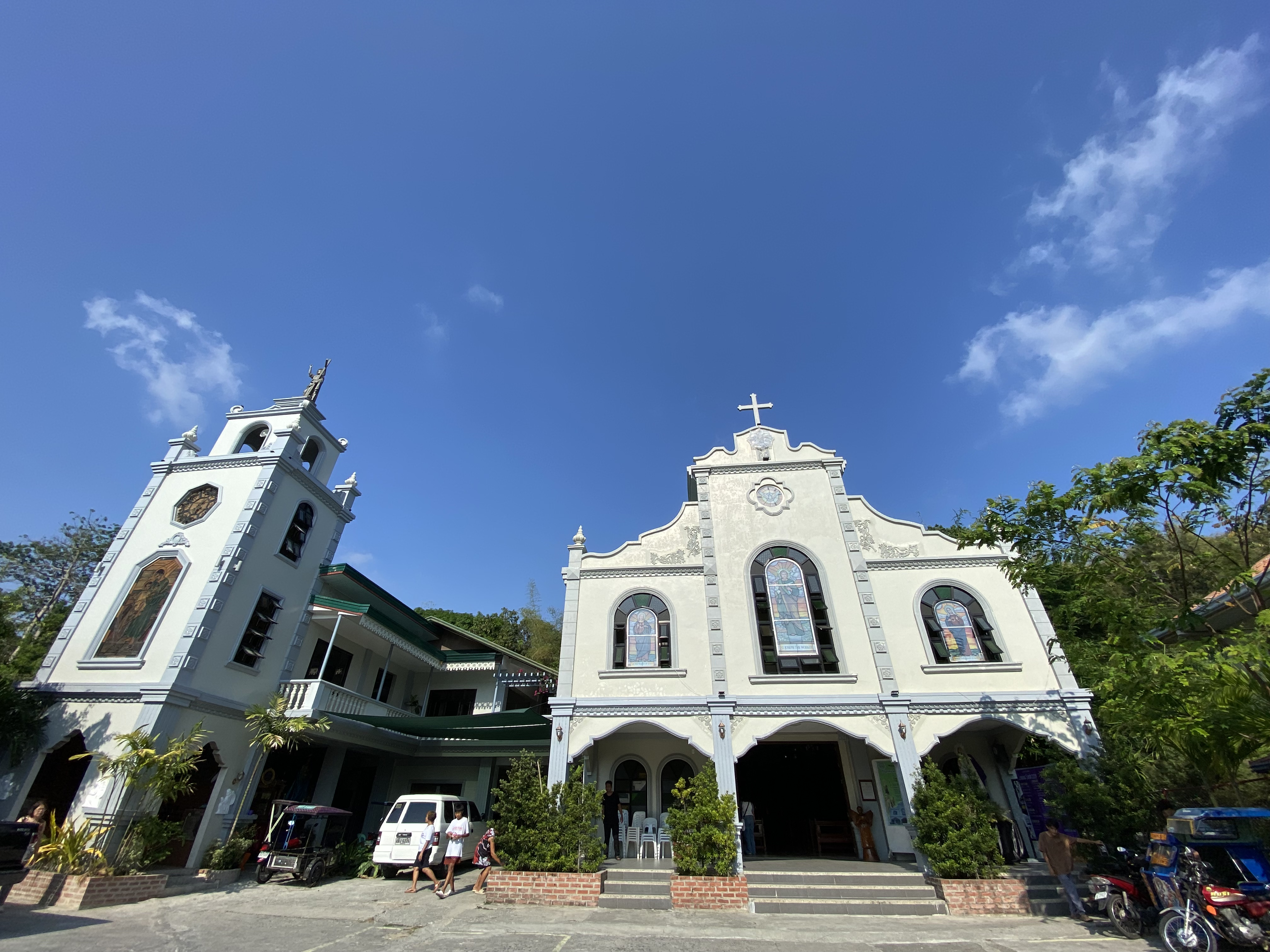
Saint Joseph the Worker Parish Church

== Sources ==
- "Brief History and Profile of Bauang". Archived from the original on March 18, 2007.
