= Manuel Arguilla =

Ilokano writer/patriot/martyr

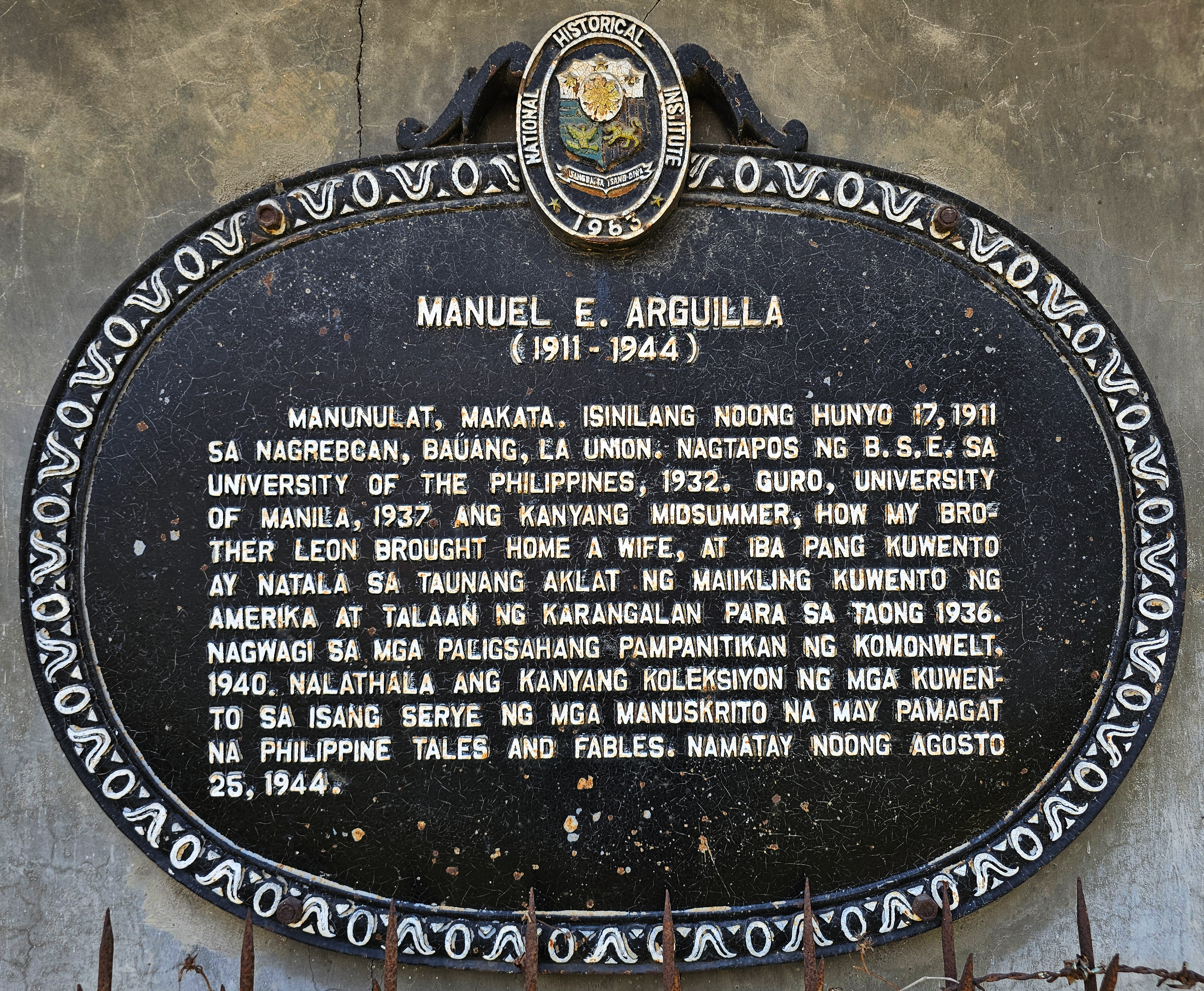
Historical marker by the National Historical Institute in his ancestral home in Nagrebcan, Bauang

Manuel Estabillo Arguilla (Nagrebcan, Bauang, June 17, 1911 – beheaded, Manila Chinese Cemetery, August 30, 1944) was an Ilokano writer in English, patriot, and martyr.

He is known for his widely anthologized short story "How My Brother Leon Brought Home a Wife," the main story in the collection How My Brother Leon Brought Home a Wife and Other Short Stories, which won first prize in the Commonwealth Literary Contest in 1940. The story explores themes of cultural clash, acceptance, and the enduring power of love.

His stories "Midsummer" and "Heat" were published in Tondo, Manila by the Prairie Schooner.

== Writing career ==
He married Lydia Villanueva, another talented writer in English, and they lived in Ermita, Manila. Here, F. Sionil José, another seminal Filipino writer in English, recalls often seeing him in the National Library, which was then in the basement of what is now the National Museum. "You couldn't miss him", José describes Arguilla, "because he had this black patch on his cheek, a birthmark or an overgrown mole. He was writing then those famous short stories and essays which I admired."

He became a creative writing teacher at the University of Manila and later worked at the Bureau of Public Welfare as managing editor of the bureau's publication Welfare Advocate until 1943. He was later appointed to the Board of Censors.

== World War II and presumed death ==
He secretly organized a guerrilla intelligence unit against the Japanese.

On August 5, 1944, he was captured and tortured by the Japanese army at Fort Santiago.

In one account, he was later transferred to the grounds of the Manila Chinese Cemetery. Along with him were guerrilla leaders, along with more than 10 men. They were then asked to dig their own graves, after which, they were immediately, one by one, beheaded with swords. His remains, as well as the others', have never been recovered, as they were dumped into one unmarked grave.

The remains of the executed men were said to be located and identified by their compatriots after the war, after a Japanese-American officer (working in the Japanese Army as a spy), revealed what he had seen and the location of the grave after the executions of August 30 of 1944. At present, their remains lie within the Manila North Cemetery.
