= Tubao =

Municipality in La Union, Philippines

Tubao San Isidro de Tubao
- Municipality
- Municipality of Tubao
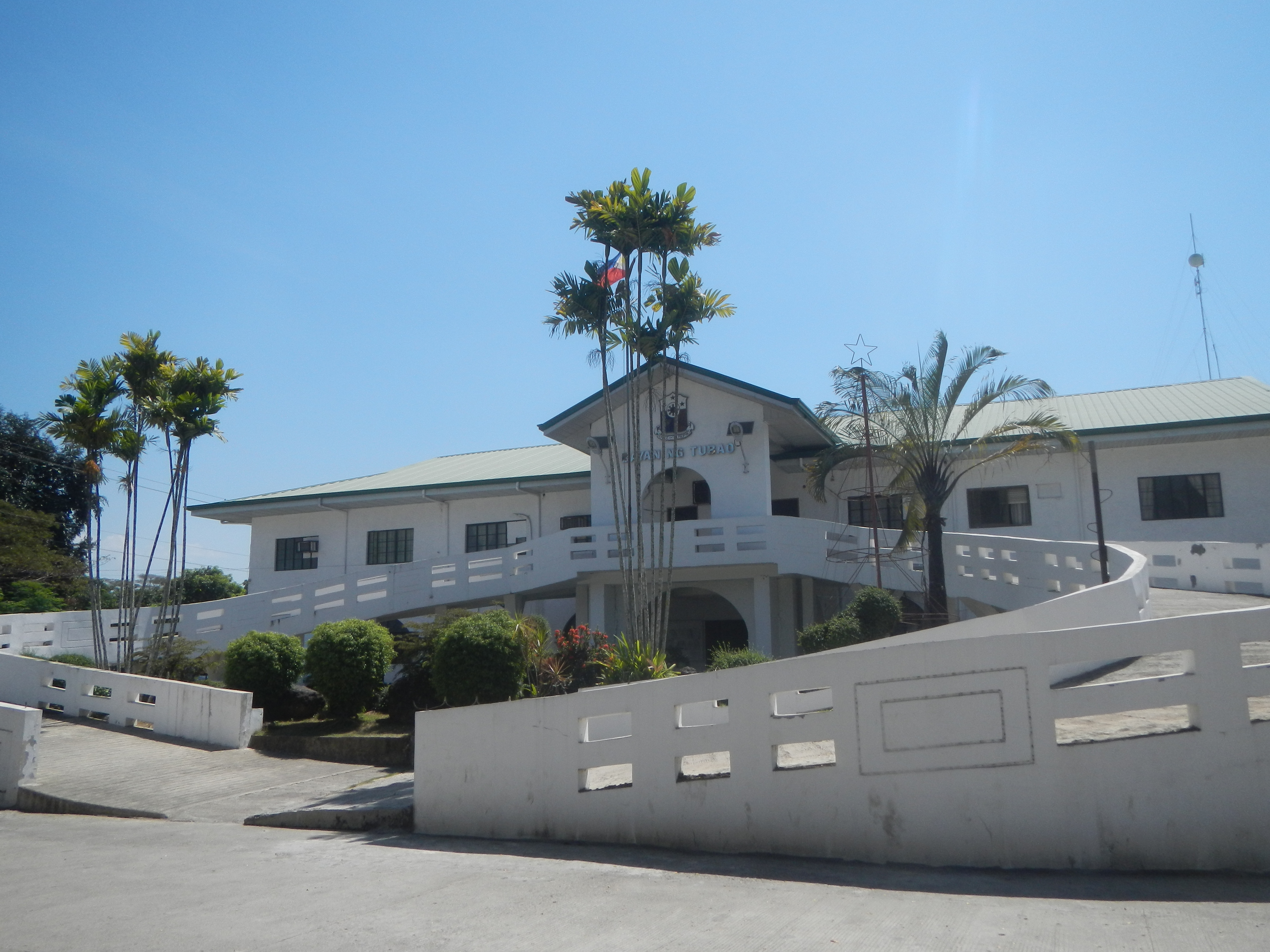
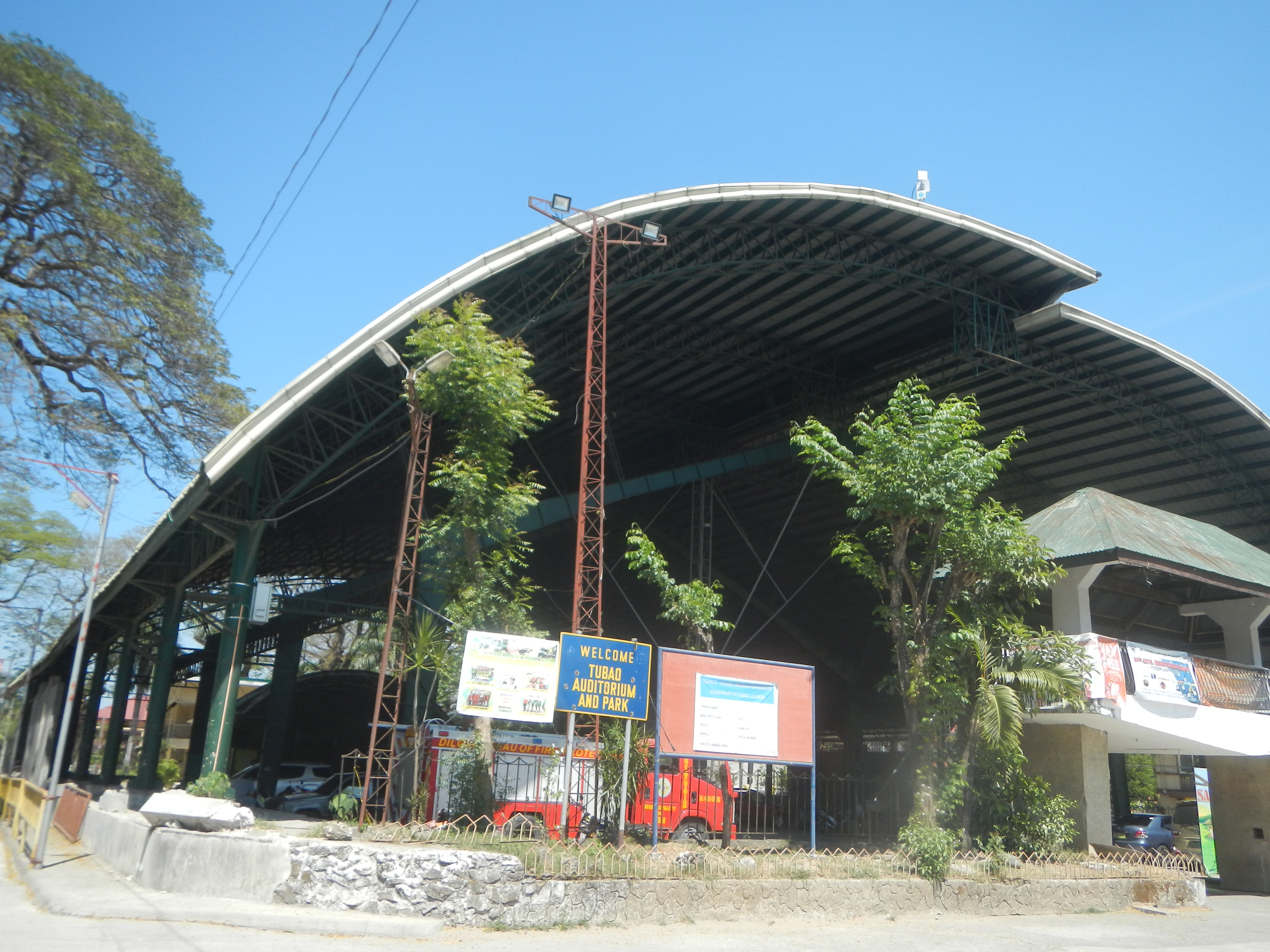
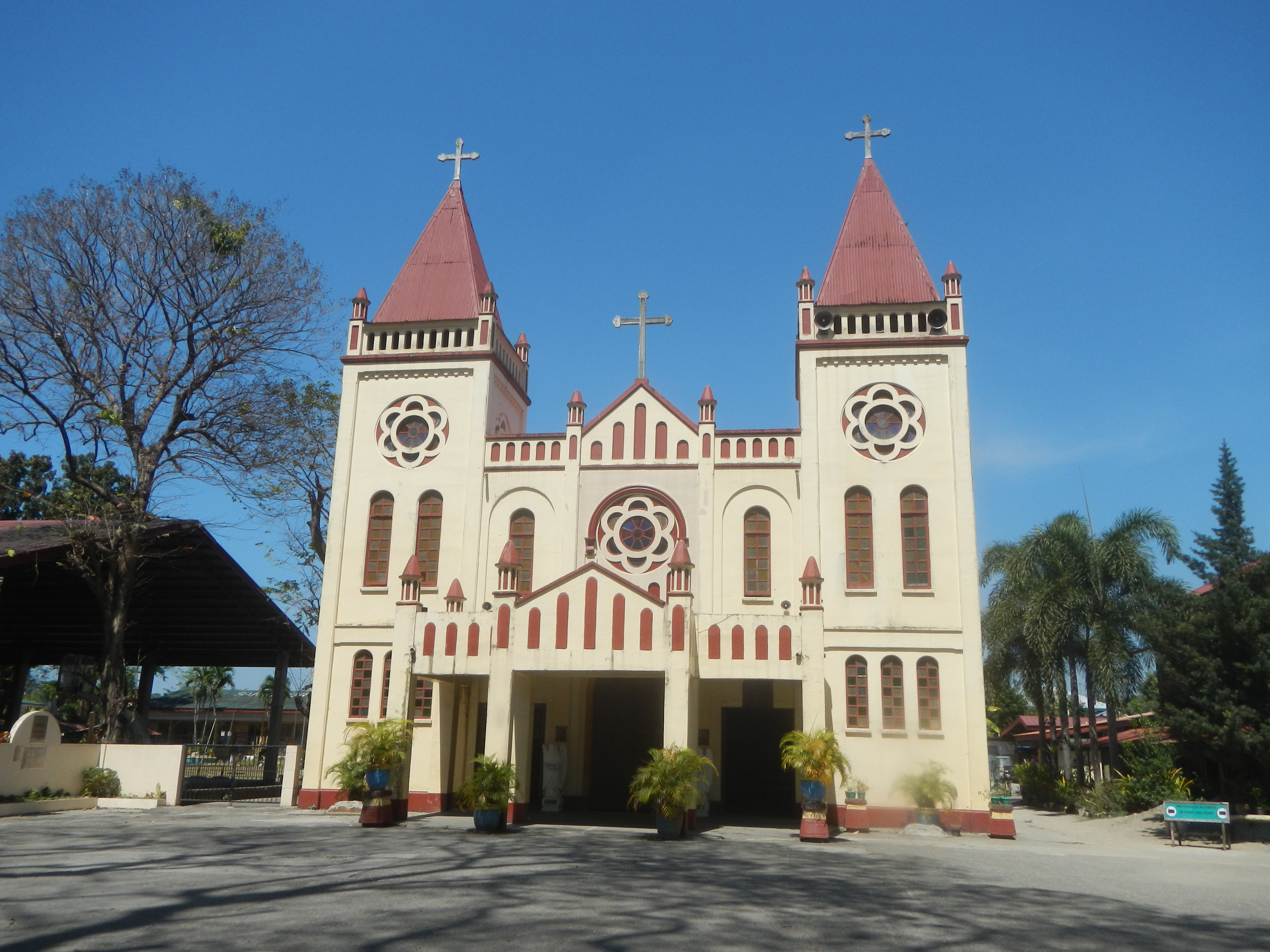
- Tubao Municipal Hall, Saint Isidore the Farmer Parish Church and Tubao Civic Center

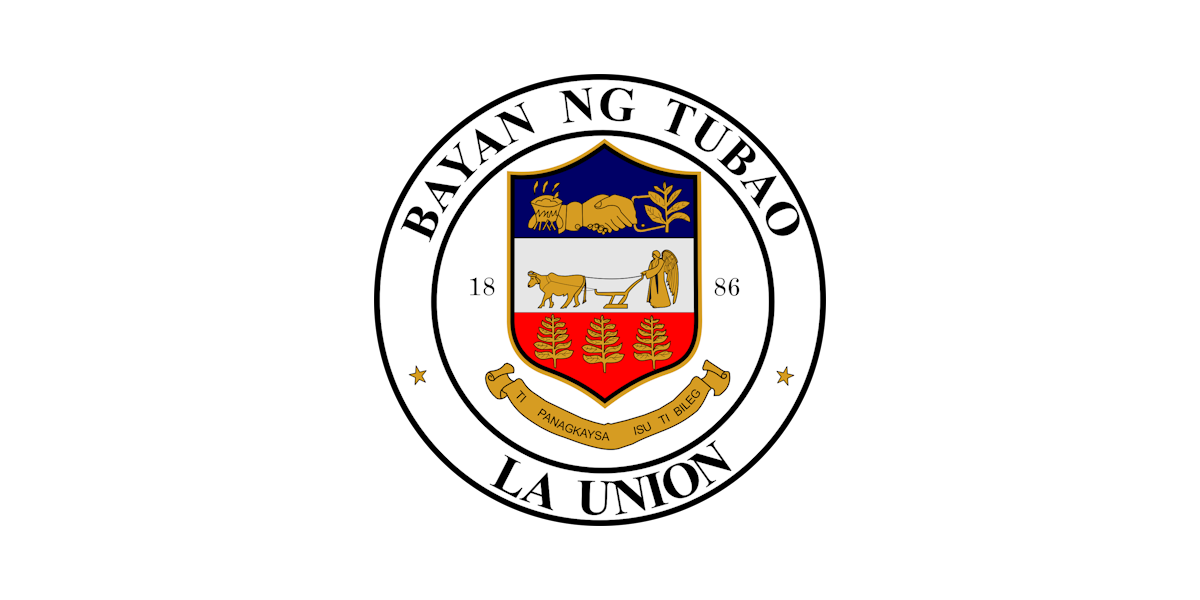
- Flag Seal
- Motto: Ti Panagkaykaysa Isu ti Bileg
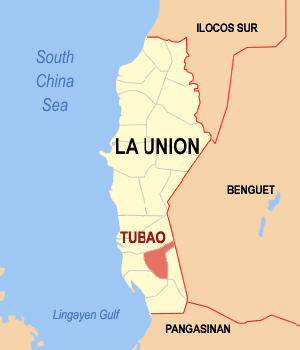
- Map of La Union with Tubao highlighted
- Interactive map of Tubao
- Location within the Philippines
- Coordinates: 16°21′N 120°25′E
- Country: Philippines
- Region: Ilocos Region
- Province: La Union
- District: 2nd district
- Founded: 1886
- Barangays: 18 (see Barangays)

Government
  - Type: Sangguniang Bayan
  - Mayor: Jonalyn G. Fontanilla-Piayas
  - Vice Mayor: Wilfredo S. Garcia
  - Representative: Dante S. Garcia
  - Municipal Council: Members: Marilou G. Bulao; Mary Muriel M. Verceles; Domingo S. Estoesta; Dominga R. Caburian; Michael M. Mapalo; Estela M. Gayo; Joseph G. Quimado; William F. Mariñas
  - Electorate: 20,457 voters (2025)

Area
  - Total: 50.75 km^{2} (19.59 sq mi)
- Elevation: 91 m (299 ft)
- Highest elevation: 392 m (1,286 ft)
- Lowest elevation: 4 m (13 ft)

Population (2024 census)
  - Total: 31,868
  - Density: 627.9/km^{2} (1,626/sq mi)
  - Households: 7,618

Economy
  - Income class: 2nd municipal income class
  - Poverty incidence: 11.9% (2023)
  - Revenue: ₱ 167.6 million (2024)
  - Assets: ₱ 436.3 million (2024)
  - Expenditure: ₱ 123.9 million (2024)
  - Liabilities: ₱ 49.85 million (2024)

Service provider
  - Electricity: La Union Electric Cooperative (LUELCO)
- Time zone: UTC+8 (PST)
- ZIP code: 2509
- PSGC: 0103320000
- IDD : area code: +63 (0)72
- Native languages: Ilocano; Pangasinan; Tagalog
- Website: www.tubao.gov.ph

Tubao, officially the Municipality of Tubao (Ilocano: Ili ti Tubao; Filipino: Bayan ng Tubao), is a landlocked municipality in the province of La Union, Philippines. According to the 2024 census, it has a population of 31,868 people.

Historically, it is known as the "Home of the Native Tobacco" given its thriving tobacco industry. For several decades, the municipality played a significant role in the tobacco trade, with its town center featuring numerous large warehouses and trading posts dedicated to tobacco. In recent years however, corn has emerged as the town's primary agricultural product, with chichacorn being one of its most notable by-products.

The municipality has an average annual income of ₱42,803,624.

== Etymology ==
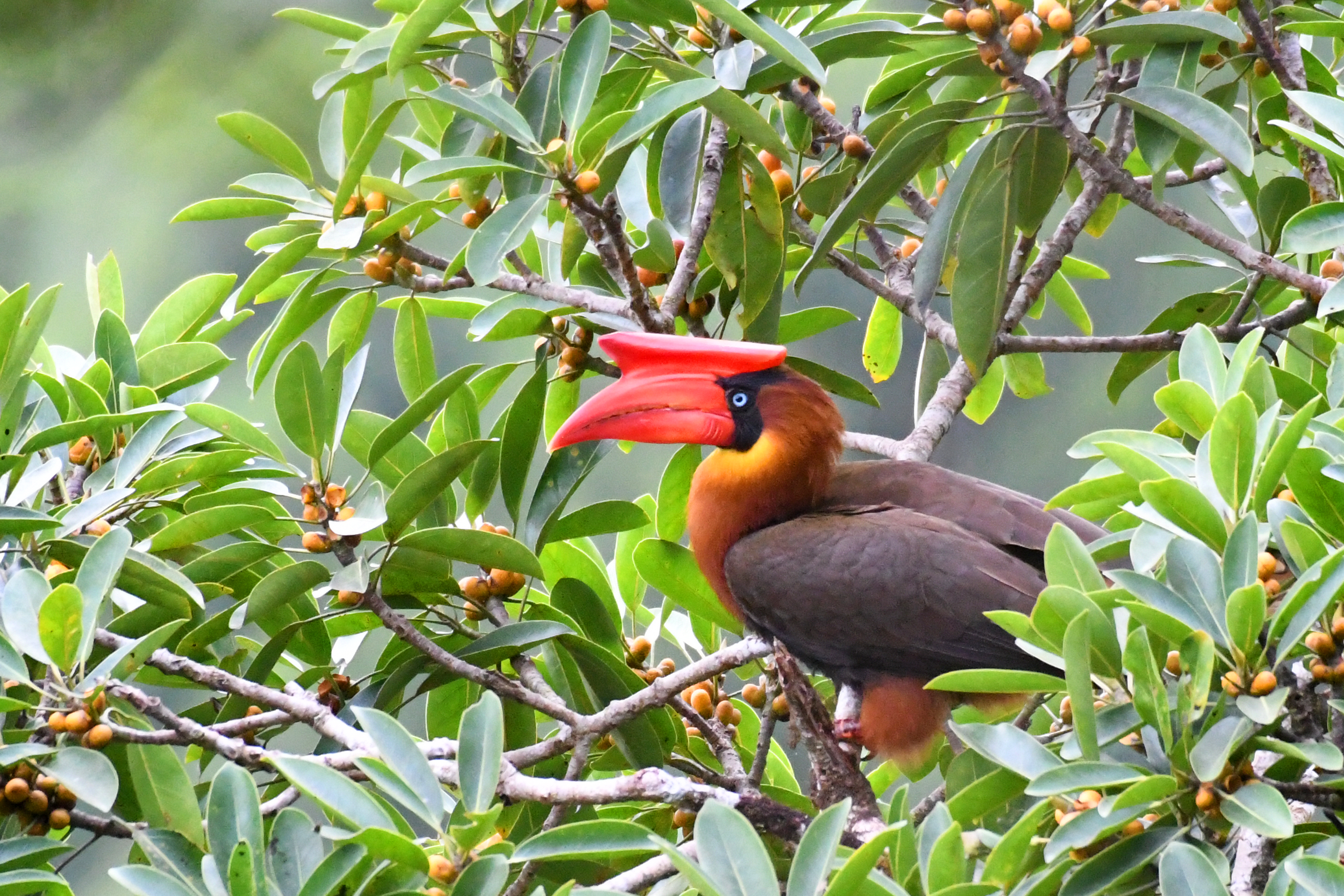
Rufous Hornbill locally known as Kalaw

The name Tubao is derived from the word "tuao," which is the sound made by the Rufous hornbill (Buceros hydrocorax), locally known as kálaw. According to legend, during the Spanish colonization, Tubao got its name when Spanish missionaries, led by Father Luis Gonzaga y Espinosa, ventured eastward from Agoo in their mission to spread Christianity. At that time, the area was a hinterland covered with dense forests.

While resting under the trees, the Spaniards distributed copies of the cartilla and catechism to the natives. As they rested, they were startled by a loud chorus of "tuao" sounds coming from the treetops. The calls of the kálaw (rufous hornbill) captured the Spaniards' attention and left them fascinated.

As Father Espinosa and his group continued their journey eastward, the distinct sound of "tuao" accompanied them, persisting throughout the forest. Upon returning from the expedition, Father Espinosa reported the name of the area as "Tuao." However, due to a clerical error in Spanish records, the name was transcribed as "Tubao," and this became the official name of the town.

== History ==
=== Early history ===
The area now known as Tubao was historically part of the Aringay-Tonglo-Balatok gold trail, a significant trade route for gold. This route linked the highland settlements of the Ibaloi people in the southern Cordillera (Benguet) with the coastal plains. It followed the Ifugao River, also known as the Aringay River, which flowed into its delta at Alinguey, an early settlement in Aringay. From Alinguey, gold was transported to the nearby port settlement of Aroo, now the town of Agoo.

Small settlements of Pangasinense-speaking people originally inhabited the plains along the river, while the eastern mountainous areas were home to Cordilleran groups, primarily the Ibalois. These settlements actively engaged in trade and barter with the coastal communities of Agoo and Aringay, as well as with Ilocanos, Tagalogs, and foreign traders from China, Japan, and Maritime Southeast Asia. Goods exchanged included porcelain, silk, cotton, beeswax, gemstones, beads, and precious metals such as gold, which was highly valued both regionally and internationally.

=== Spanish Colonial Era ===
With the arrival of the Spanish in the region, the settlements were organized into a ranchería and brought under the authority of Spanish colonial officials and Augustinian friars. The indigenous population was subjugated and required to convert to Christianity. The Pangasinense-speaking residents, who were the original inhabitants, were introduced to Spanish agricultural practices and socio-political systems, including the encomienda. Under this system, natives were obliged to pay tribute or taxes in the form of crops, cloth, or forced labor in exchange for protection and governance.

By the 18th century, Ilocano migrants began settling in the area, driven by population pressures and the oppressive conditions under Spanish rule in the Ilocos province. These migrants initially arrived in Agoo and Aringay, then part of Pangasinan province, and gradually moved inland to the fertile plains of Tubao. Intermarriage between the Ilocano settlers and the Pangasinan-speaking natives led to cultural assimilation, resulting in the population becoming predominantly Ilocanized in culture and language.

On October 29, 1849, Governor-General Narciso Clavería issued a decree creating the province of La Union by merging towns from Pangasinan, Ilocos Sur, and the Cordillera. This was reiterated on March 2, 1850, by Governor-General Antonio María Blanco, with Tubao, a barrio of Agoo and Aringay, as a founding town; and eventually confirmed by Queen Isabella II on April 18, 1854.

==== Establishment of Municipality of Tubao ====
By the mid-1880s, Tubao emerged as a distinct barrio located along the eastern boundaries of Agoo and Aringay. The area was designated as a visita (satellite mission station) under the jurisdiction of the larger church district in Agoo. A non-resident clergy from Agoo periodically visited the settlement. The barrio was named San Isidro de Tubao, in honor of its patron saint, whose feast day is celebrated annually on May 14 and 15.

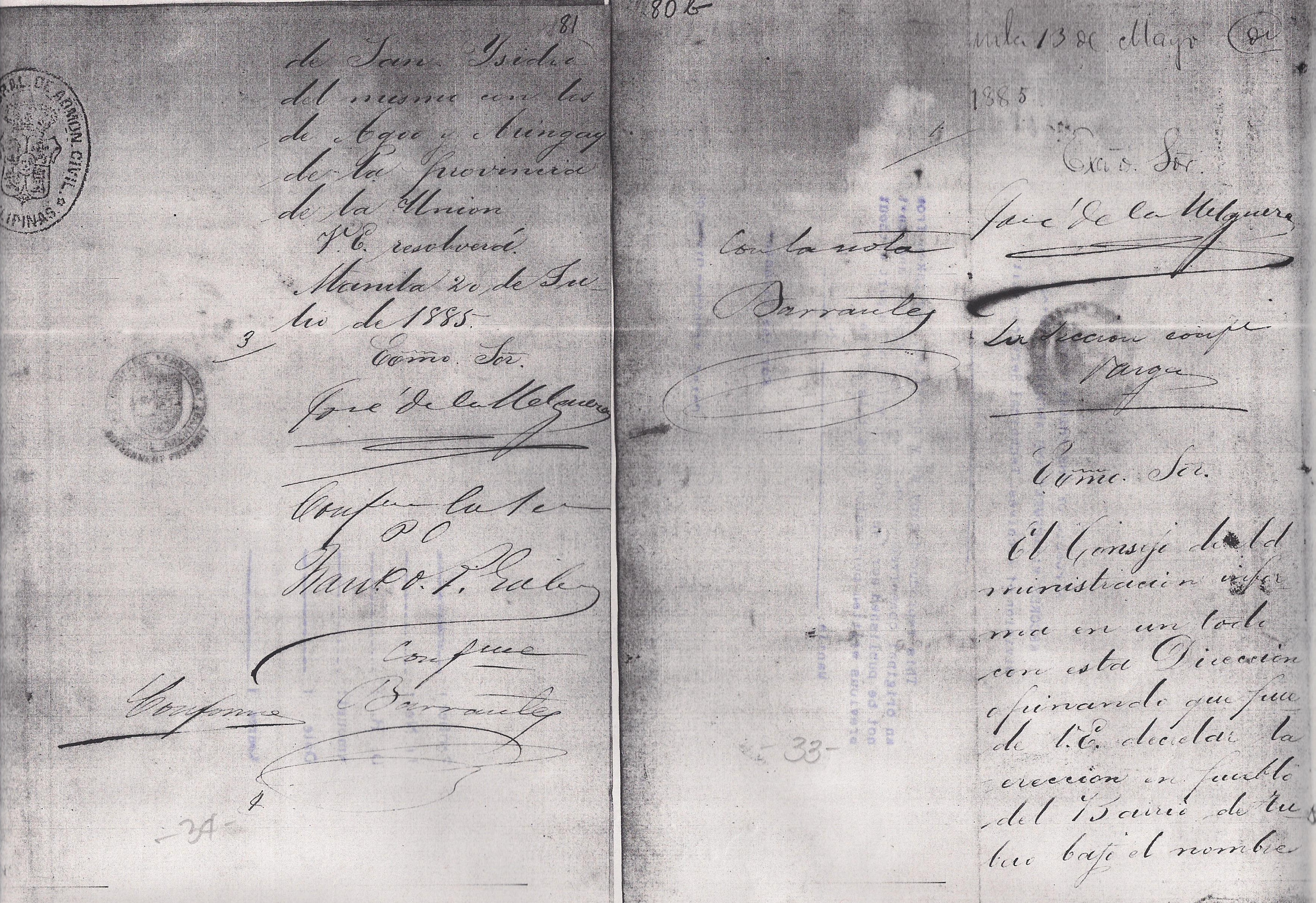
Photocopy of a portion of the original Spanish document creating the new municipality of Tubao in 1885.

On March 28, 1873, leaders and residents from nine barrios of Agoo (Macoton, Amboot, Caoigue, Pideg, Damosil, Masalip, Linapew, Anduyan, and Ambañgonan) and six barrios of Aringay (Santa Teresa, Copang, Calopaan, Bugarin, Guinitaban, and San Pascual) petitioned for the creation of a new municipality.

The area of Pugo, then part of Tubao, was originally known as Ranchería Tulosa. In 1883, quail hunters renamed it Ranchería Pugo, after the local term for quail (pugo).

On July 20, 1885, Tubao was officially established as a town through a Superior Decreto. Shortly thereafter, on August 28, 1885, La Union’s Spanish Military Governor Federico Francia proposed a review of Aringay's borders to accommodate Tubao’s growing population. A bishop from Vigan, following a pastoral visit to Agoo and Aringay, also advocated for the establishment of a new town and initiated the construction of a chapel in Tubao.

On November 10, 1885, Real Orden No. 901 affirmed the Superior Decreto of July 20, officially recognizing Tubao as the "nuevo pueblo de Tubao." On November 16, 1885, Governor Francia formalized Tubao's status as the 14th town of La Union, formed from barrios ceded by Agoo and Aringay. The town was formally inaugurated on March 8, 1886, by Governor Francia.

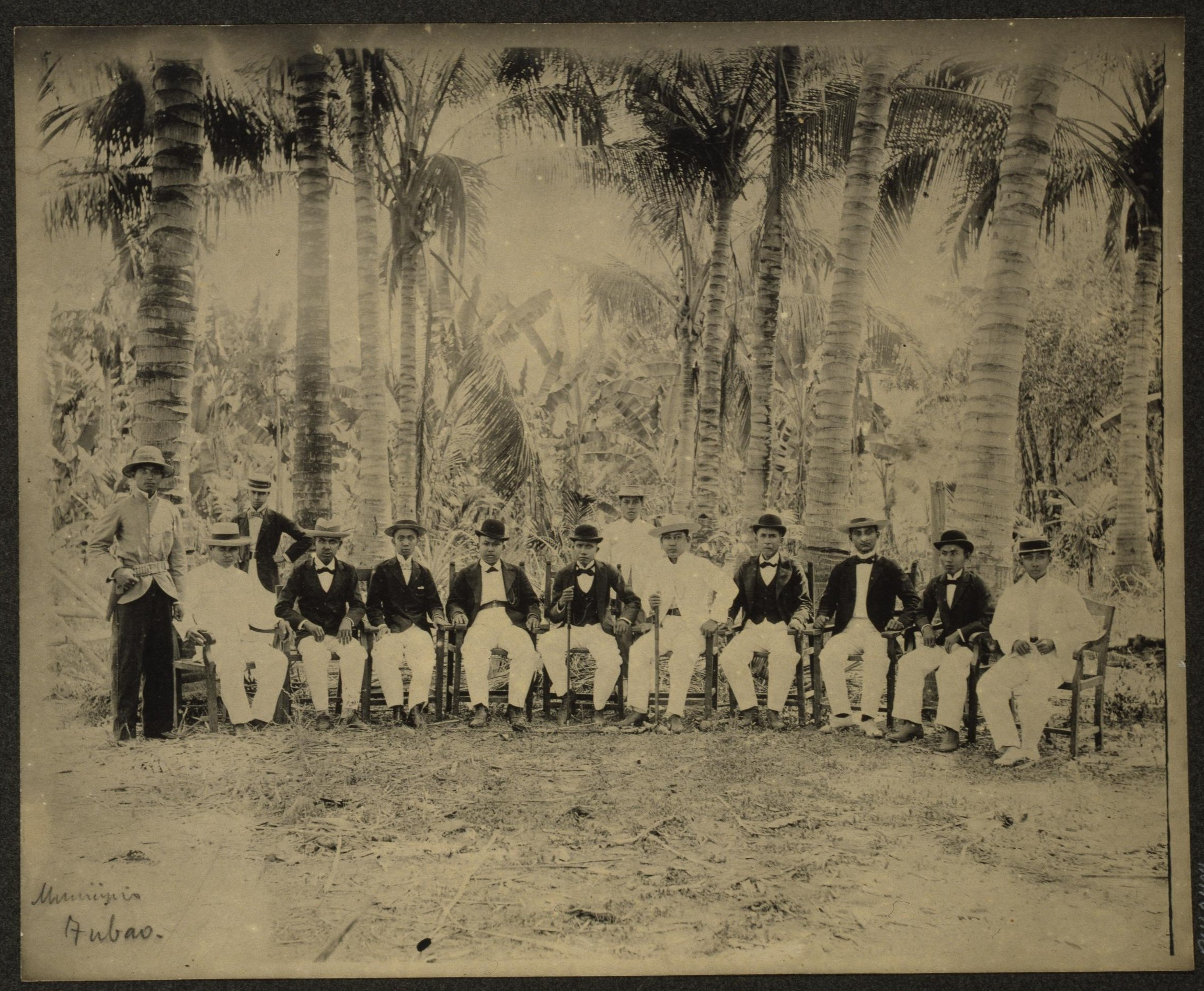
Municipal council of Tubao circa 1900

==== Tubao Parish and the legacy of the Belgian missionaries ====
During the Spanish period until the 20th century, Catholicism played a major role in the life of the people of Tubao. Tubao was a visita of the Parish of Agoo. A chapel and a convent of light materials were erected in 1884. Ten years later, the parish of Tubao was founded. Its first pastor, Father Juan Garcia arrived in March 1896. The cause of the delay was the subsidy to be voted upon in the Cortes Generales of Madrid. The missionary started gathering materials for a new church and a convent but could not carry out his plan as he left in January 1898; it took more than 30 years before these projects materialized.

==== 1896 (Heritage) St. Isidore the Farmer Parish Church ====
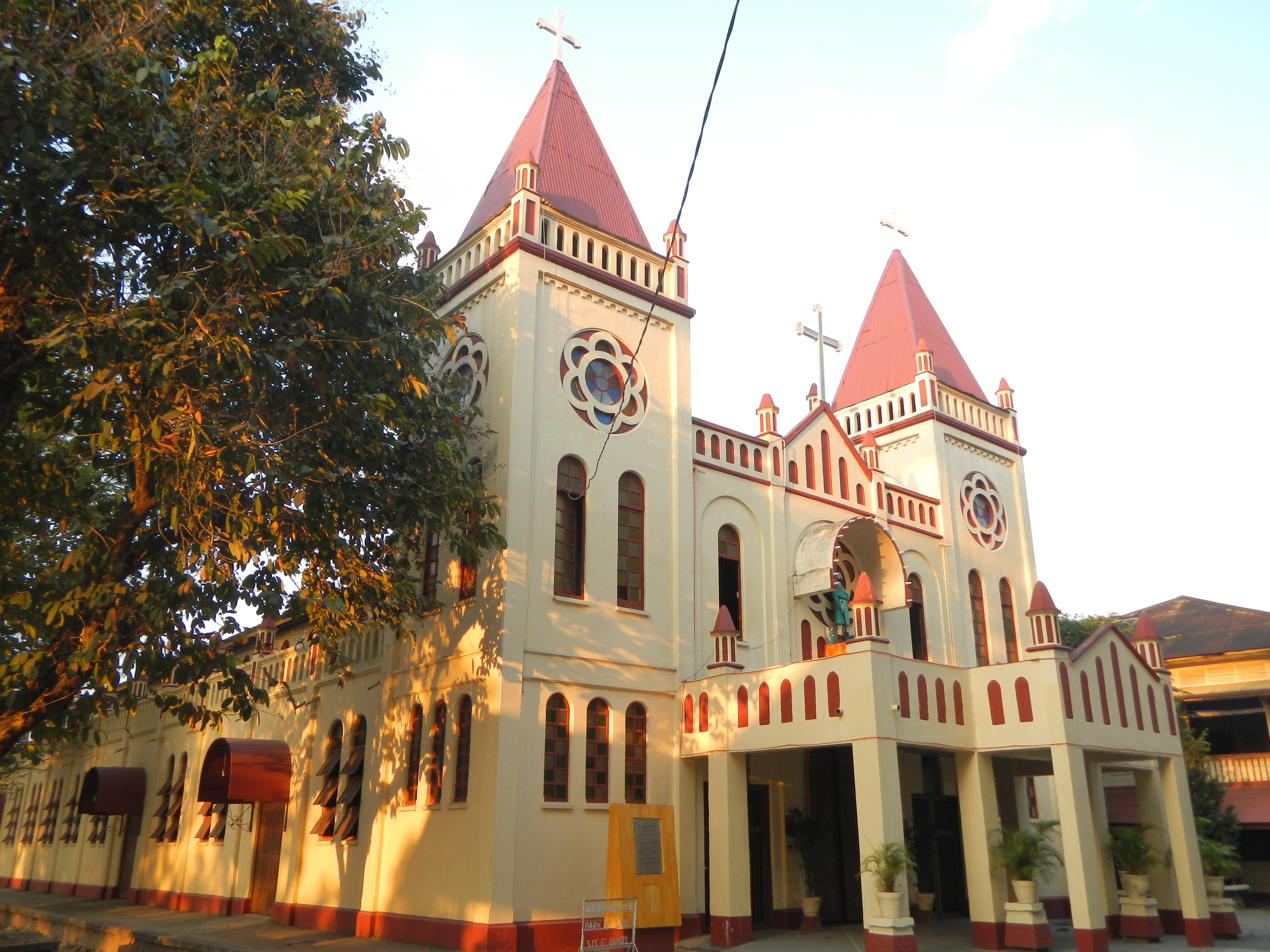
Church facade

As of 2012, the St. Isidore the Farmer Parish Church of Tubao (canonically erected in 1896), 2509 La Union, celebrates its fiesta every May 15. It is under the jurisdiction of the Diocese of San Fernando de La Union (Dioecesis Ferdinandopolitana ab Unione, Suffragan of Lingayen – Dagupan, which was created on January 19, 1970, and erected on April 11, 1970, comprising the Civil Province of La Union, under the Titular, St. William the Hermit, February 10). The Church is under a diocese of the Latin Church of the Catholic Church in the Philippines from the Archdiocese of Nueva Segovia. The Tubao Church is under the Vicariate of St. Francis Xavier with Vicar Forane, Fr. Joel Angelo Licos. The Church was rehabilitated and renovated in 1980 under Jose D. Aspiras.

=== American Colonial Era ===
On March 8, 1900, during the Philippine–American War, the people of Tubao petitioned against the return of the friars. On November 19, 1899, General Samuel Baldwin Marks Young, American commander in Northern Luzon marched through Tubao to Aringay then to Agoo. Later he "spent a week galloping in and out of Tubao and Salcedo" in pursuit of General Emilio Aguinaldo and his forces.

Capt. Santiago Fontanilla, heading 130 men with four officers and 87 rifles, fought against the Americans. When he narrowly escaped capture in Kapangan, he abandoned personal equipment which included a horse and Colt .45 pistol both belonging to Colonel Gutierrez, his commander.

Up to 1912, the condition of the young parish was unstable and precarious. The priests did not stay long and several times, Tubao was without a spiritual father. In 1908, it became again a visita, but of Aringay this time.

Conditions were better in Pugo. Although smaller and never given a pastor in the Spanish time, it had a Dutch-born resident priest since 1909, Rev. Gerard Martens. When Tubao lost its priest once more in 1911, the parishioners sent a petition to the bishop requesting his excellency to send a missionary of the Congregation of the Immaculate Heart of Mary (Congregatio Immaculati Cordis Mariae) in case no Filipino priest should be available. On 20 November 1911, Father Morice Vanoverbergh arrived from Bauko, a CICM sister mission of Bontoc. His stay was short. About 8 February 1912, he learned that Father Jules Sepulchre, one of the founders of the mission in Bontoc and Bauko, became ill upon his return to Bauko. Vanoverbergh went on horseback to visit him climbing the Santo Tomas mountain and arrived in Bauko on 14 February just in time for the burial, Sepulchre having died in Bontoc Hospital the day before. Vanoverbergh was asked by his superior to take over that mission. After two months, Father Martens was transferred to Tubao and stayed for eighteen years.

During his stint, Father Martens extended the boundaries of the church yard and constructed the main part of the church. He rebuilt in 1916 the chapel in barangay Santa Teresa and gave a school chapel to Caoigue in 1917 and an ermita to Anduyan in 1926. He acquired the rectory which was put up in Spanish time. He also started a primary school in Anduyan and Caoigue in 1913. In June 1915, he opened a Grade I class on the ground floor of the rectory or convent to be later named Tubao Catholic School and conducted a parish census. A Belgian missionary from the same congregation (Congregatio Immaculati Cordis Mariae) Rev. Father Charles Beurms, assisted Father Martens and became the first director of the school. Father Martens also founded "The Apostleship of Prayer" (1912) and "Los Defensores de la Libertad" which later became the "Cabsat ni San Isidro."

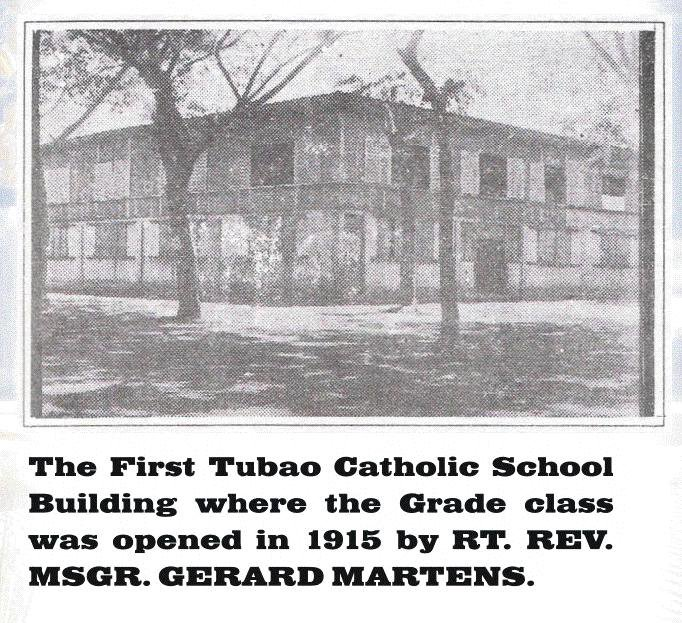

In 1922, the first group of Belgian missionary sisters of the Immaculate Heart of Mary (Immaculati Cordis Mariae) arrived headed by Mother Marie Andrea and followed by Mother Marie Ambroise in 1923. The latter became the first principal for the Tubao Catholic high school with the opening of the First Year class. In 1924, the Second Year class was added.

The lot on which the church building and the convent of the Sisters were built on was bought from Doña Laureana Novicio de Luna, mother of the famous Luna brothers -- Juan Luna and Antonio Luna.

In 1923 the priests acquired the house of Don Urbano Dacanay for P1,000 pesos, west of the plaza, and housed in it the newly founded Tubao Catholic High School. It was renamed the Msgr. Martens Building. This building was destroyed in World War II during the liberation from the Japanese occupation. In January 1951, Father Albert Van Nuffelen sold the lot back for P1,800 pesos to the relatives of the former owner viz., Mr. Bernardino Madriaga and Milagrina Oller who built their house on it.

From 1930 to 1933, during Father Alois Proost's term, the church sanctuary and sacristies were completed. He donated the big church bells. He organized a scout band, a string band and the first girl scout unit in the Philippines. He also added Third and Fourth year classes in the Tubao Catholic High School established by Father Martens before. A primary school was also opened in Pideg (1931) and Amallapay (1933?).

From 1934 to 1935, Father Morice Vanoverbergh installed the tiled floors on the church. He was a scholar and did outstanding work in botany, anthropology and linguistics.

The parish priests expanded the church yard and bought more lots in the 1920s up to the 1950s. In 1927, a land was bought from Baltazar Dulay for P200 pesos, north of the church. A few years later, the sacristy was built on this property. Another lot, west of the sacristy, was bought from Don Francisco Zandueta (La Union Governor from 1910 to 1912) and was partly occupied by a bamboo warehouse for storing tobacco rented by Chan Chin Ko Baltazar, father of Florencio Chan Baltazar who later became municipal mayor. The warehouse was converted into three classrooms for boys of the intermediate class. In 1940, Father Carlos Desmet procured the means to have a new school building within the premises to replace the old bamboo shack. It was the Sancho Building named after Msgr. Sancho, the bishop of Nueva Segovia who helped with the means. Again, this building was razed to the ground during the war. Today the area is an open field of the school.

=== Japanese Occupation ===
During the Japanese occupation from 1942 to 1944, classes were suspended. As the bombs destroyed the old Martens and Sancho buildings, primary classes were held in the house of Benedicto Verceles, southeast of the rectory or convent while intermediate and high school classes were held in the convent. The town became a center for evacuees from neighboring municipalities. Because of its mountainous terrain on the east, it was also an ideal site for the guerrillas who fought the Japanese forces.

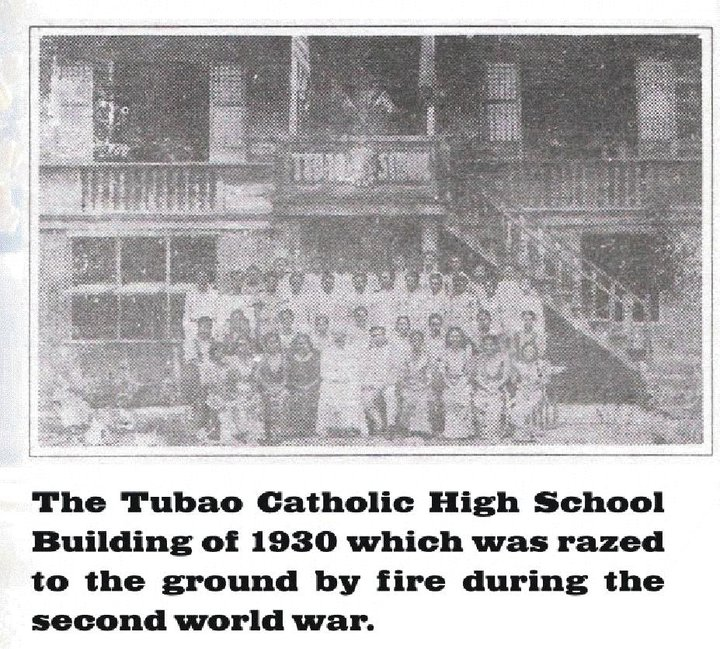

Among those who found refuge and passage in the town were top officials of the land led by then Executive Secretary Manuel Roxas who was later captured by the Japanese in 1942, Senator Quintin Paredes, future Speaker Jose Laurel Jr. and Teofilo Sison. Meanwhile, the Japanese established a garrison beside the Catholic Church. Even the residence of former Mayor Antonio Verceles became the staff house of all the Japanese officers. Hence, its preservation from the mass burning of houses during the Japanese retreat.

=== Philippine Independence ===
Father Albert Van Nuffelen, parish priest from 1949 to 1954 constructed two new buildings and named these the new Martens and Sancho buildings, south and north of the present basketball court which he also built. In 1954, Father Jose de Hayes became parish priest and school director. He proposed the school to have a Christian name. In 1956, Tubao Catholic School was renamed San Alberto Magno Academy (SAMA) in honor of Saint Albert the Great and his predecessor, Father Albert Van Nuffelen.

More lots were acquired from Doña Maxima Zarate in October 1950 by Father Albert Van Nuffelen where the present high school building now stands; Alfredo Milanes, Felix Garcia, Teodoro Ramos, Timoteo Ramos for the lots at the eastern side of the church in 1951. The northern section of the school garden was bought from Valeriano Mapalo by Father Jose de Hayes in 1957.

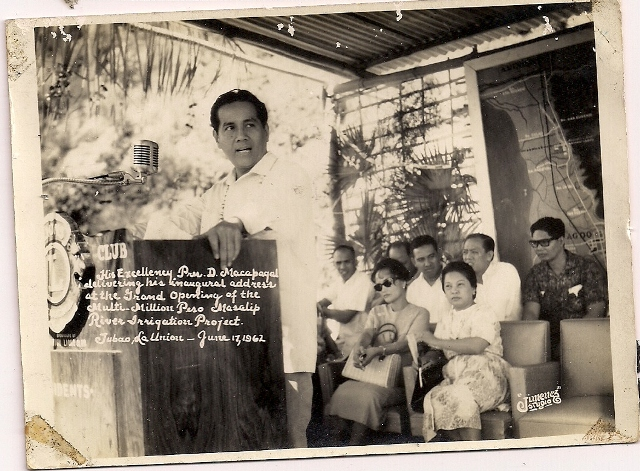
President Diosdado Macapagal inaugurating the Masalip Dam Irrigation project in Tubao, La Union. June 17, 1962

On June 17, 1962, President Diosdado Macapagal inaugurated the multi-million peso Masalip River Irrigation Project together with First Lady Eva Macapagal.

In 1963, Father Henry Geeroms initiated and sought means to construct another building which was located at the back of the Sancho building to house a library, a laboratory and four classrooms. Today, that building has been demolished and a new building now has been constructed in its place.

During the Golden Jubilee in 1965, the school populace was 1,393 including the 115 pupils of Caoigue. But enrollment gradually dwindled due to the opening of free public schools in the different barangays. Elementary classes were phased out in 1973 due to financial constraint.

In 1966, Father Jaime Quatannens, organized the credit union/cooperative to find an alternative lending facility other than those provided by unscrupulous moneylenders. On August 13, 1966, with 39 pioneer-members and a starting paid-up capitalization of Three hundred fourteen pesos (P 314.00), the Tubao Credit Union, Inc. as originally named was formally organized and registered with the Cooperative Administration Office (CAO) under RA 2023 and approved on October 26, 1966, under Registration No. 001503.

In 1974, then Tourism Minister Jose Aspiras brought Miss Universe Amparo Muñoz of Spain and other beauties to Tubao for a tour.

After 68 years, the Belgian CICM and ICM sisters handed the school administration in 1984 to the Diocese of San Fernando, La Union. The last ICM principal was Sister Cleofe Bacon who left in 1998.

The Sancho building was damaged by the 1990 Luzon earthquake and was renovated. Only the first floor remains of the original building built by Father Van Nuffelen. The Martens building now houses the Saint Isidore School for grade school classes which was revived in the late 1990s.

On December 30, 1996, Fr. Noel C. Mabutas, Parish Priest and Mr. Jose C. Taveres, Parish Council President signed the Centennial Marker in the Church Door, under the lead of Archbishops Oscar V. Cruz, Antonio R. Tobias, D.D. and Antonio Ll. Mabutas, D.D. with the Centennial Executive Board.

The 1954 Our Lady of Lourdes Grotto (built by Fr. Albert Van Nuffelen, CICM, on 1954) was enthroned with Marker on February 11, 2005, by Rev. Camilo P. Villanueva, Parish Priest.

On December 30, 2006, 110th Anniversary of the Church the Trailblazer Memorial honoring the Centennial Celebration of the CICM - RP 1911–1982, 7 Decades, was erected on the Church door, and blessed by Bishop Antonio Rillera, S.V.D., D.D.

== Geography ==
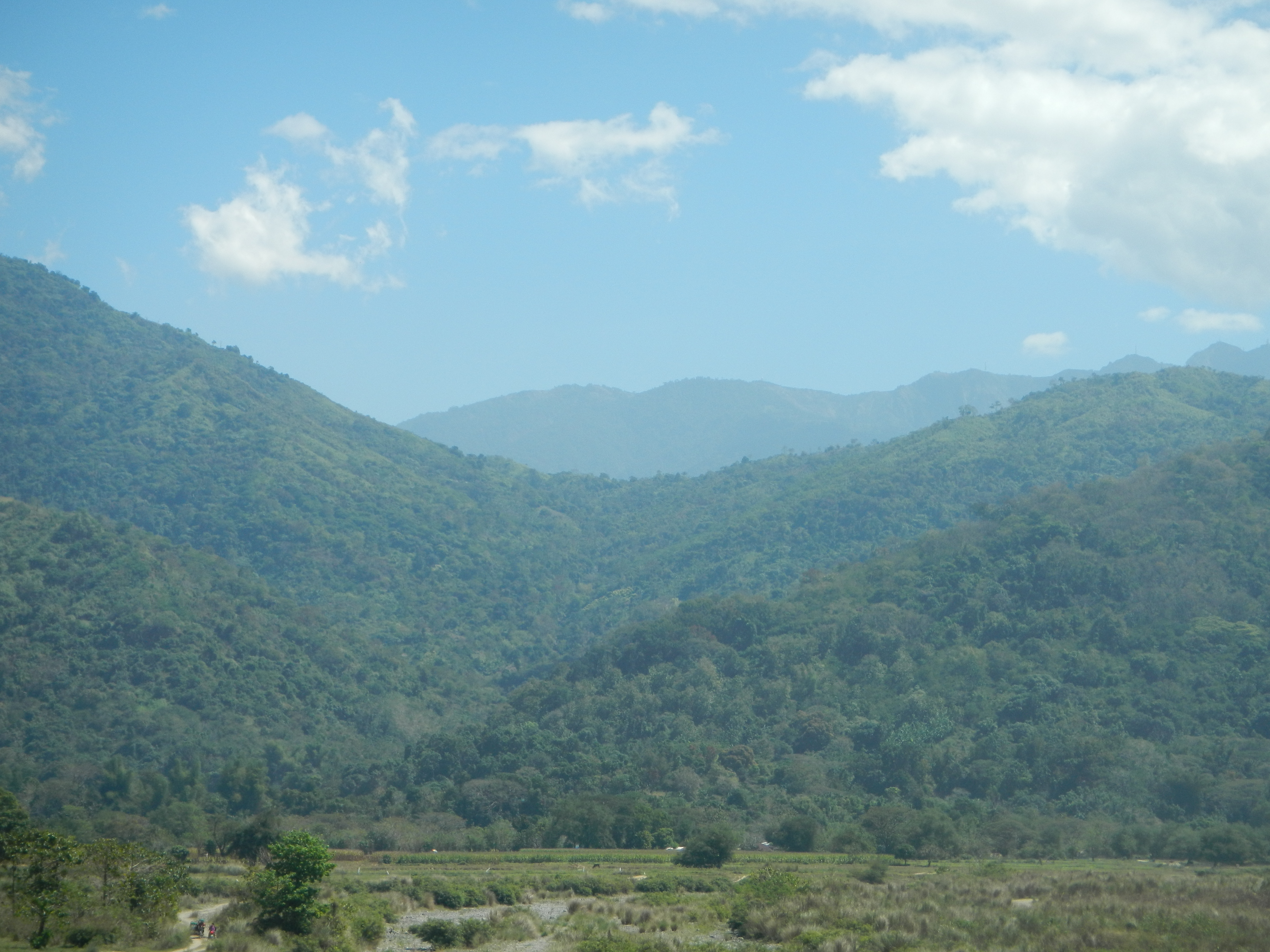
Cordillera terrains in Rizal

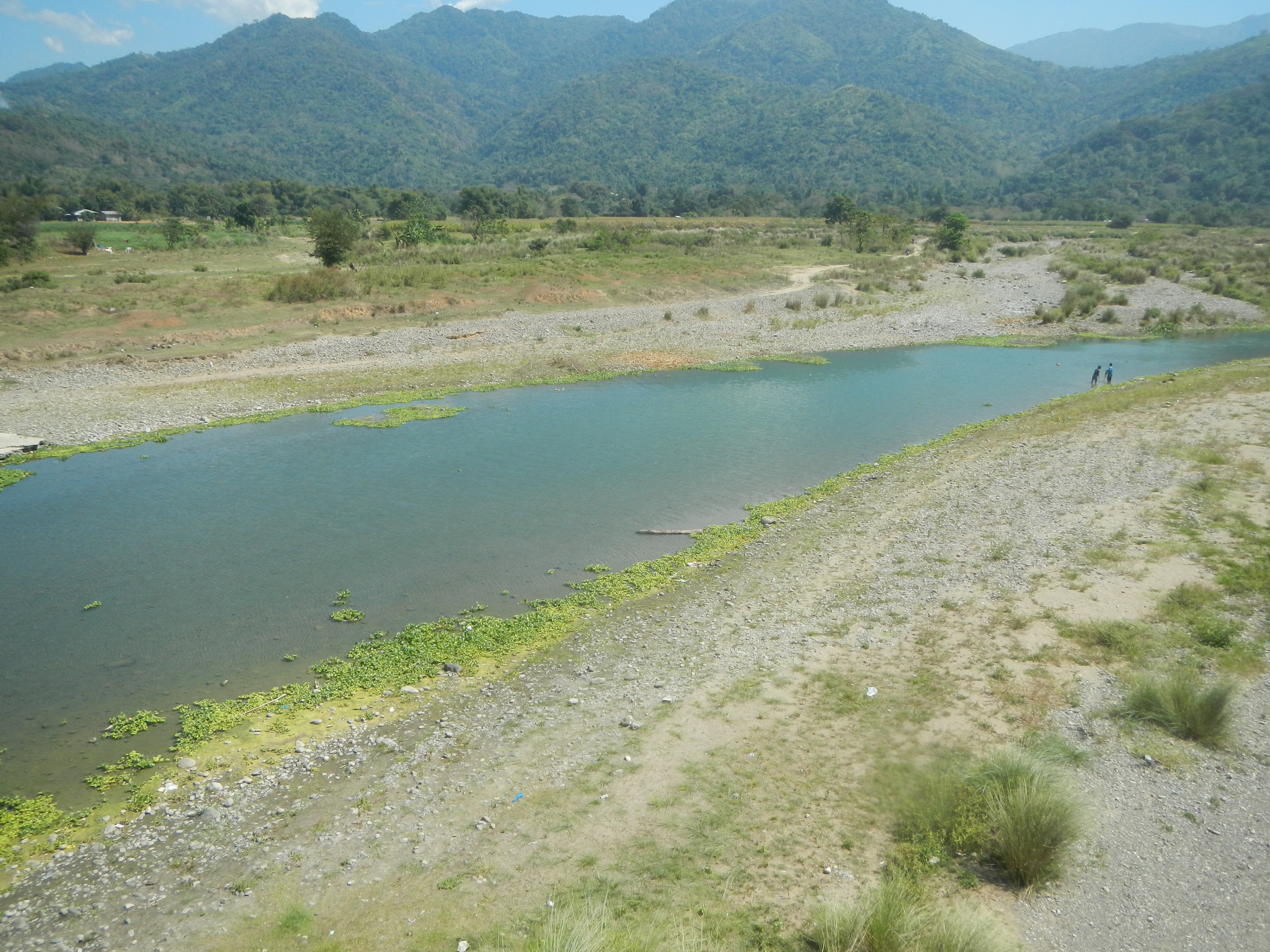
Aringay (Ifugao) River in Anduyan

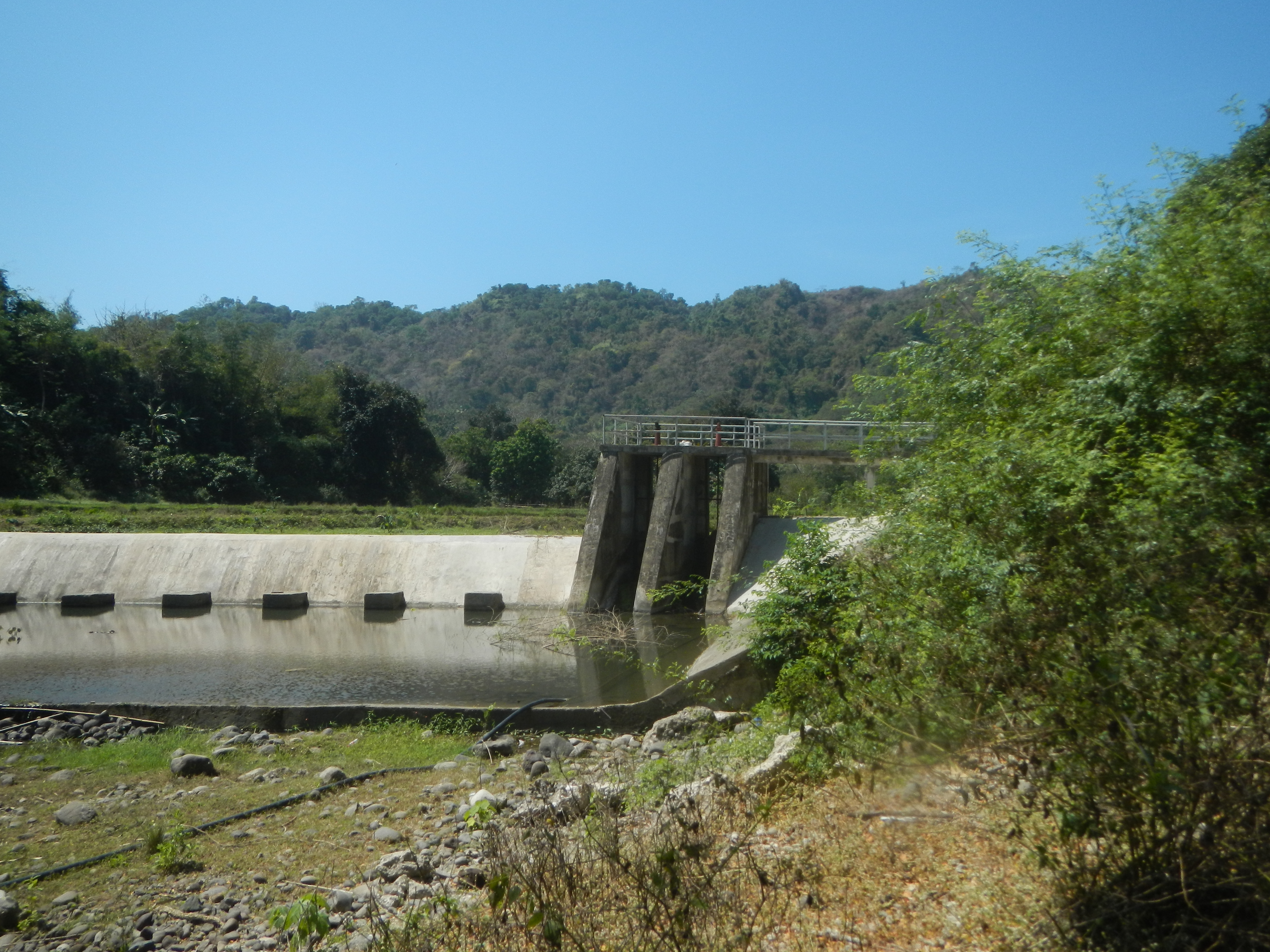
River dam in Pideg

An inland land-locked town, the Municipality of Tubao is located in Ilocos Region lying along the south-eastern side of La Union province. It is bounded on the north by Aringay, on the east by Pugo, on the south-west by Santo Tomas, on the south by Rosario, and on the west by Agoo.

Tubao is situated 35.48 kilometres (22.05 mi) from the provincial capital San Fernando, and 234.09 kilometres (145.46 mi) from the country's capital city of Manila.

=== Topography ===
Rural topography is seventy percent (70%) alluvial plains and thirty percent (30%) uplands. Highest portion is located in Barangay Rizal, which is more than 500 metres (1,600 ft) above sea level along the foothill of Cordillera Central. Flat lands are found in the middle portion of the town, in between its southern and northern hilly sections. The town is traversed by several creeks and rivers, mainly the Ifugao River, also known as the Aringay River.

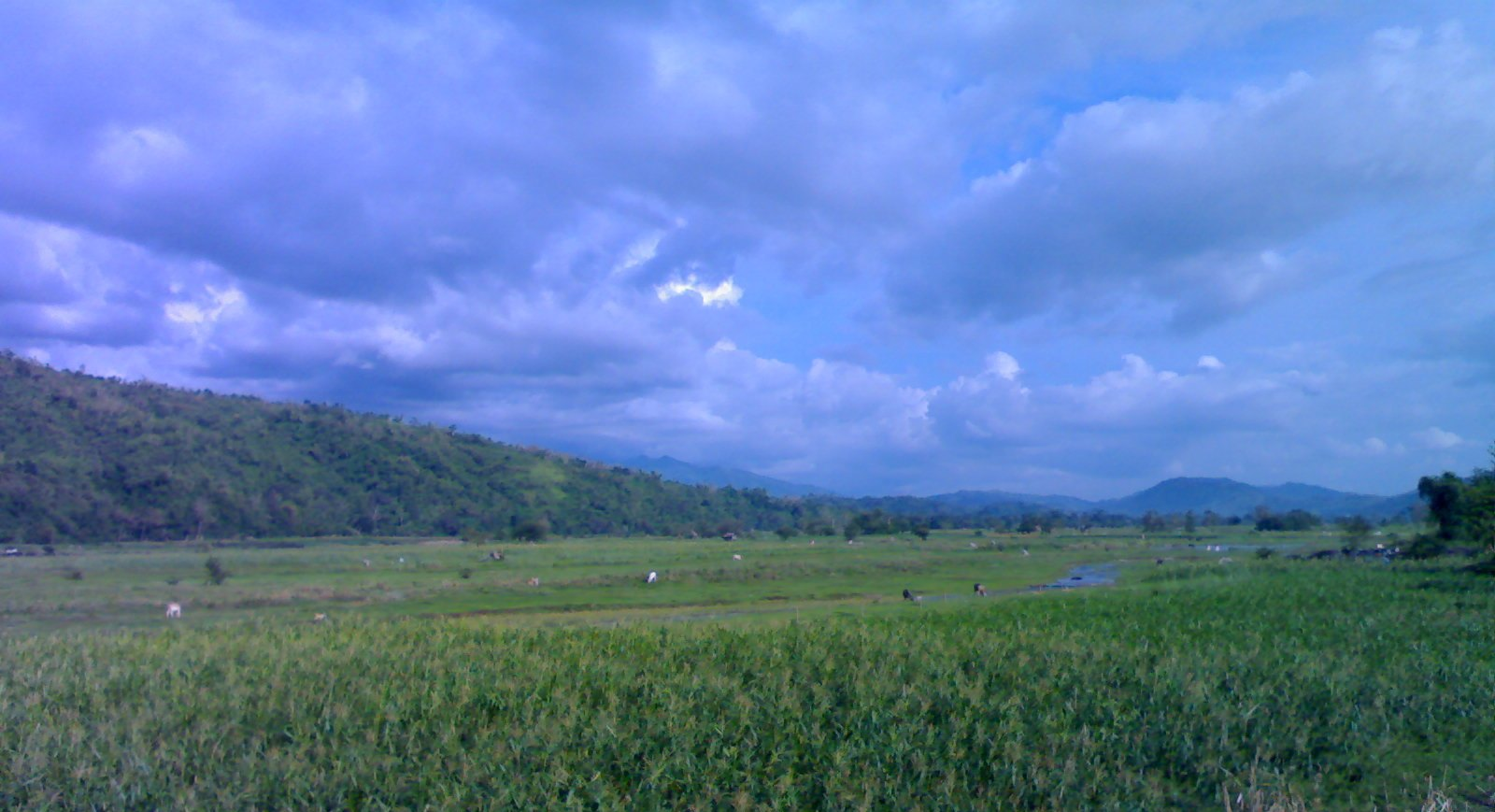
Fields in Sta. Teresa

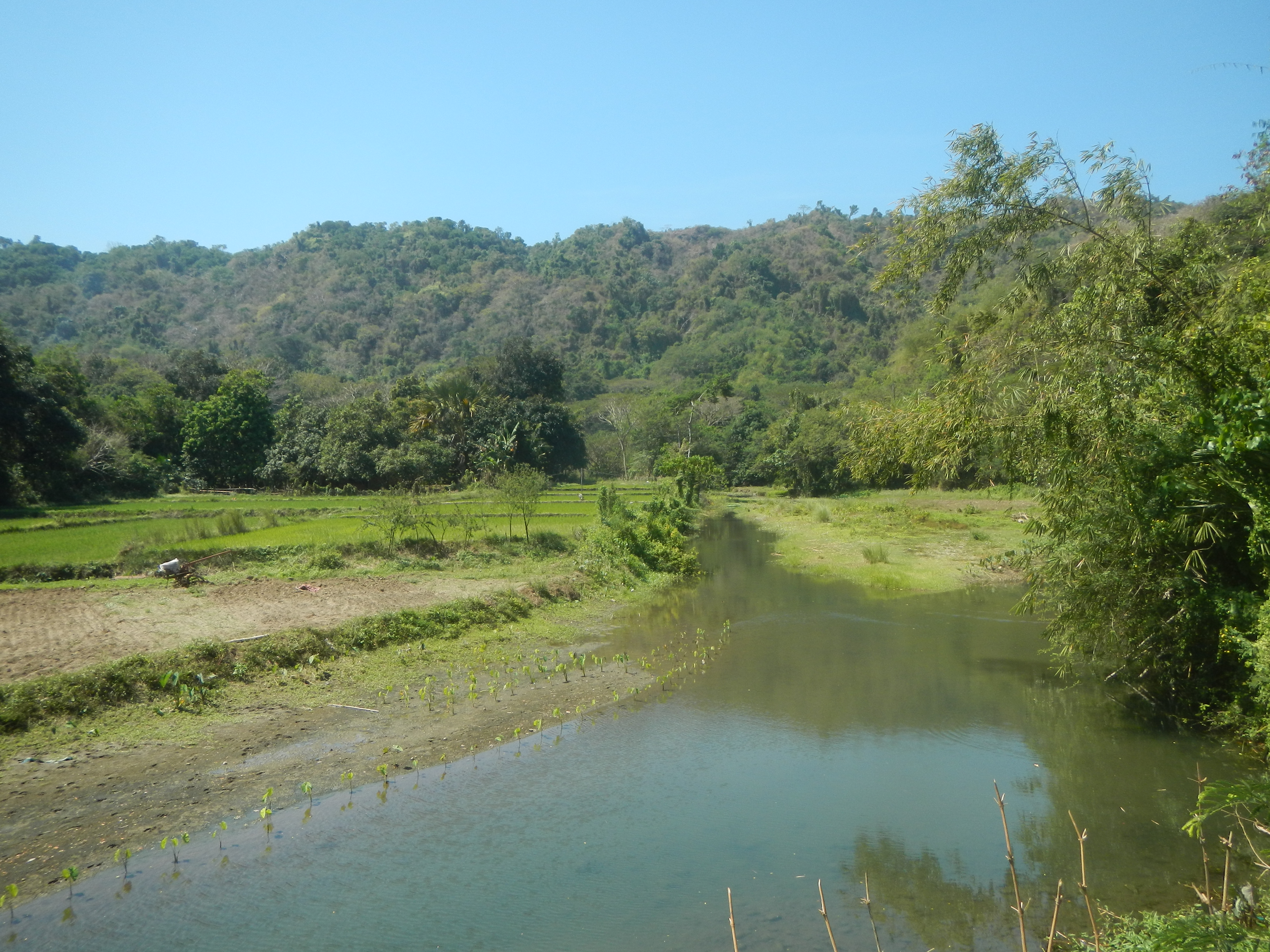
Creek in Francia Sur

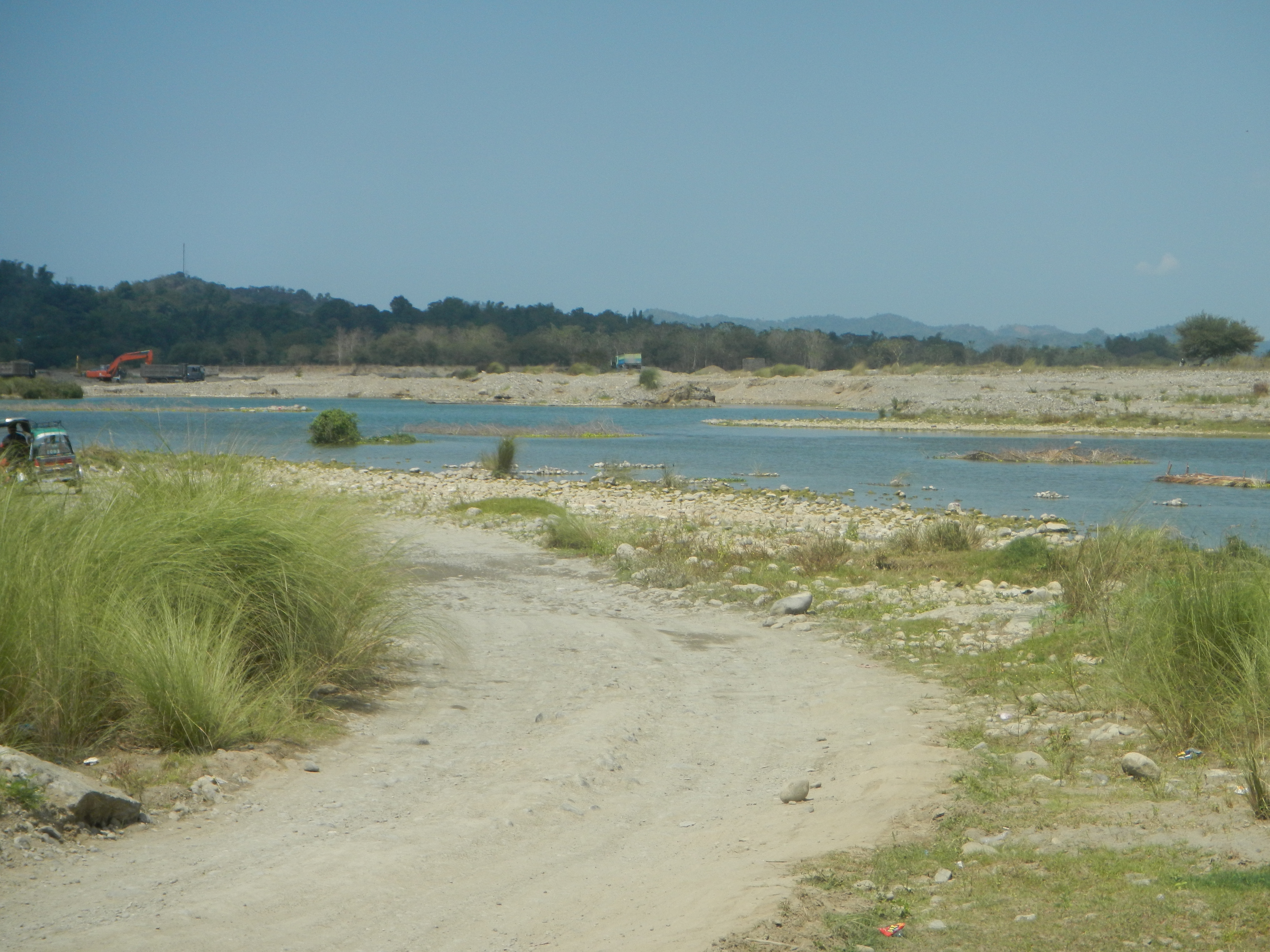
Riverbank in Garcia

==== Slope ====
- 0-8 percent where slope of land is nearly level and gently sloping accounts 2,664 hectares. Most of these are located in Santa Teresa, Leones East, Poblacion and Gonzales with some part of Linapew, Francia Sur, Halog East and lower lands of Rizal;
- 8-30 percent slope which are rolling to moderately steep with the lowest share of 60 hectares, mostly found in Halog East and West;
- 30-50 percent slope of land which are steep comprising an area of 1,070 hectares and are found in Amallapay, Pideg and some part of Lloren, Magsaysay and Anduyan;
- 50 percent and above are very steep slopes of land found mostly in Rizal and the boundary lines of Pideg, Linapew and Amallapay. This accounts 1,427 hectares.

==== Soil type ====
Soil types are found as follows: San Manuel silt loam in Barangay Santa Teresa with an approximate area of 336 hectares; Umingan Clay loam in Poblacion and Anduyan; Barcelona Clay in Barangay Leones; Mountain soils, annam clay loam and Bauang clay in Santa Teresa, Halog, Gonzales, Anduyan, Linapew and Garcia.Soil types are found as follows: San Manuel silt loam in Barangay Santa Teresa with an approximate area of 336 hectares; Umingan Clay loam in Poblacion and Anduyan; Barcelona Clay in Barangay Leones; Mountain soils, annam clay loam and Bauang clay in Santa Teresa, Halog, Gonzales, Anduyan, Linapew and Garcia.

=== Barangay ===
Tubao is politically subdivided into 18 barangays. Each barangay consists of puroks and some have sitios.

- Amallapay
- Anduyan
- Caoigue
- Francia Sur
- Francia West
- Garcia
- Gonzales
- Halog East
- Halog West
- Leones East
- Leones West
- Linapew
- Lloren
- Magsaysay
- Pideg
- Poblacion
- Rizal
- Santa Teresa

=== Climate ===
The climate prevailing in the municipality is characterized by two distinct seasons, dry from November to April and wet during the rest of the year.

Annual main rainfall as recorded by PAGASA is 217.8 ml with a peak of 1,059.6 millimeters in December. The mean temperature is 27.5 Celsius. It rises to as high as 29.2 Celsius in May and goes down as low as 25 Celsius in January. Monthly average number of rainy days is 11.2, while relative humidity is 78.9.

Direction of the wind blowing in the area is mostly from south-west to north-east due to south-west monsoons. The area has a natural shield of winds blowing from the east because of the Cordillera mountain ranges. During summer, in the absence of any weather disturbance, wind blows from west to east as natural sea breeze.

Climate data for Tubao, La Union
Month	Jan	Feb	Mar	Apr	May	Jun	Jul	Aug	Sep	Oct	Nov	Dec	Year
Mean daily maximum °C (°F)	30 (86)	31 (88)	33 (91)	34 (93)	32 (90)	31 (88)	30 (86)	29 (84)	30 (86)	31 (88)	31 (88)	31 (88)	31 (88)
Mean daily minimum °C (°F)	20 (68)	21 (70)	22 (72)	24 (75)	25 (77)	25 (77)	25 (77)	25 (77)	24 (75)	23 (73)	22 (72)	21 (70)	23 (74)
Average precipitation mm (inches)	15 (0.6)	16 (0.6)	24 (0.9)	33 (1.3)	102 (4.0)	121 (4.8)	177 (7.0)	165 (6.5)	144 (5.7)	170 (6.7)	56 (2.2)	23 (0.9)	1,046 (41.2)
Average rainy days	6.3	6.6	9.5	12.8	20.6	23.5	25.4	23.4	23.2	21.4	14.0	8.2	194.9
Source: Meteoblue

== Demographics ==
Population census of Tubao
Year	Pop.	±% p.a.
1903	7,030	—
1918	9,181	+1.80%
1939	8,344	−0.45%
1948	9,105	+0.97%
1960	12,304	+2.54%
1970	14,552	+1.69%
1975	15,462	+1.22%
1980	17,604	+2.63%
1990	21,138	+1.85%
1995	23,039	+1.63%
2000	24,773	+1.57%
2007	26,402	+0.88%
2010	26,993	+0.81%
2015	28,729	+1.19%
2020	31,763	+2.14%
2024	31,868	+0.08%
Source: Philippine Statistics Authority

Based on the 2020 Census of Population and Housing (2020 CPH), the municipality of Tubao, La Union recorded a total population of 31,763 persons as of May 2020. This represents an increase of 3,034 persons compared to the total population of 28,729 persons recorded in the 2015 Census of Population (POPCEN). The municipality’s population grew at an average annual growth rate (PGR) of 2.13 percent from 2015 to 2020, translating to an addition of approximately 21 persons per year for every 1,000 individuals in the population. Sixty years ago, the population of Tubao was only 12,304 persons, which is less than one-third of its population in 2020.

=== Population by Barangay ===
Among the 18 barangays of Tubao, Lloren was the most populous, comprising 11.68 percent of the total population. It was followed by Anduyan with 6.71 percent, Amallapay with 6.38 percent, Gonzales with 6.02 percent, Magsaysay with 5.86 percent, and Francia West with 5.83 percent. The remaining barangays each contributed less than 5.80 percent to the total municipal population. Poblacion was the least populated barangay, accounting for 2.61 percent of the total population, maintaining its status as the least populous barangay since 2015.

=== Sex Ratio ===
The sex ratio in Tubao was recorded at 105 males per 100 females in 2020. Males constituted 51.15 percent of the population, while females accounted for 48.85 percent. This marked a slight decrease in the sex ratio compared to 2015. Males outnumbered females in the 0–64 age group, whereas females were more numerous than males in the 65 years and older age group.

=== Median Age ===
The median age of Tubao's population increased to 28.28 years in 2020, up from 26.55 years in 2015. This indicates that half of the population was younger than 28.28 years. The largest age group was 15–19 years (9.48 percent), followed by 20–24 years (9.22 percent) and 10–14 years (9.21 percent). Males outnumbered females in the 0–54 years age range, while females exceeded males in the older age group (55 years and above).

=== Birth Registration ===
The proportion of individuals with registered births in Tubao was 99.74 percent, equivalent to 31,647 persons. Among those with registered births, 51.17 percent were males, and 48.83 percent were females. This translates to a sex ratio of 104 males per 100 females for registered births.

=== Dependency Ratio ===
The dependency ratio in Tubao decreased to 48 dependents per 100 working-age persons (15–64 years) in 2020, down from 54 dependents in 2015. This indicates that for every 100 individuals in the working-age population, there were 48 dependents, consisting of 37 young dependents (below 15 years) and 10 old dependents (65 years and older).

=== Marital Status ===
Of the household population aged 10 years and older, 39.87 percent were married, while 38.97 percent were never married. The remaining population was categorized as follows: 5.23 percent widowed, 14.76 percent in common-law/live-in arrangements, and 1.07 percent annulled or separated. Among those who were never married, 56.14 percent were males, while 43.86 percent were females.

=== Household Size ===
In 2020, Tubao’s household population was 31,728 persons, which was 2,999 persons higher than the 28,729 persons recorded in 2015. The number of households increased from 6,441 in 2015 to 7,618 in 2020, resulting in an average household size of 4.2 persons. This was slightly lower than the average household size of 4.5 persons recorded in 2015.

=== Voting Population ===
The town has 20,469 registered voters as of 2022. The voting-age population (18 years and older) in Tubao comprised 68.95 percent of the total household population in 2020, an increase from 65.35 percent in 2015. Among the voting-age population, 50.62 percent were males, while 49.38 percent were females.

=== Ethnicity and language ===
The population of Tubao is predominantly Ilocano, with smaller populations of Tagalog, Pangasinan, and indigenous groups such as the Bago and Ibaloi. The primary language spoken is Iloco, while Filipino and English are widely used for communication and instruction.

=== Religion ===
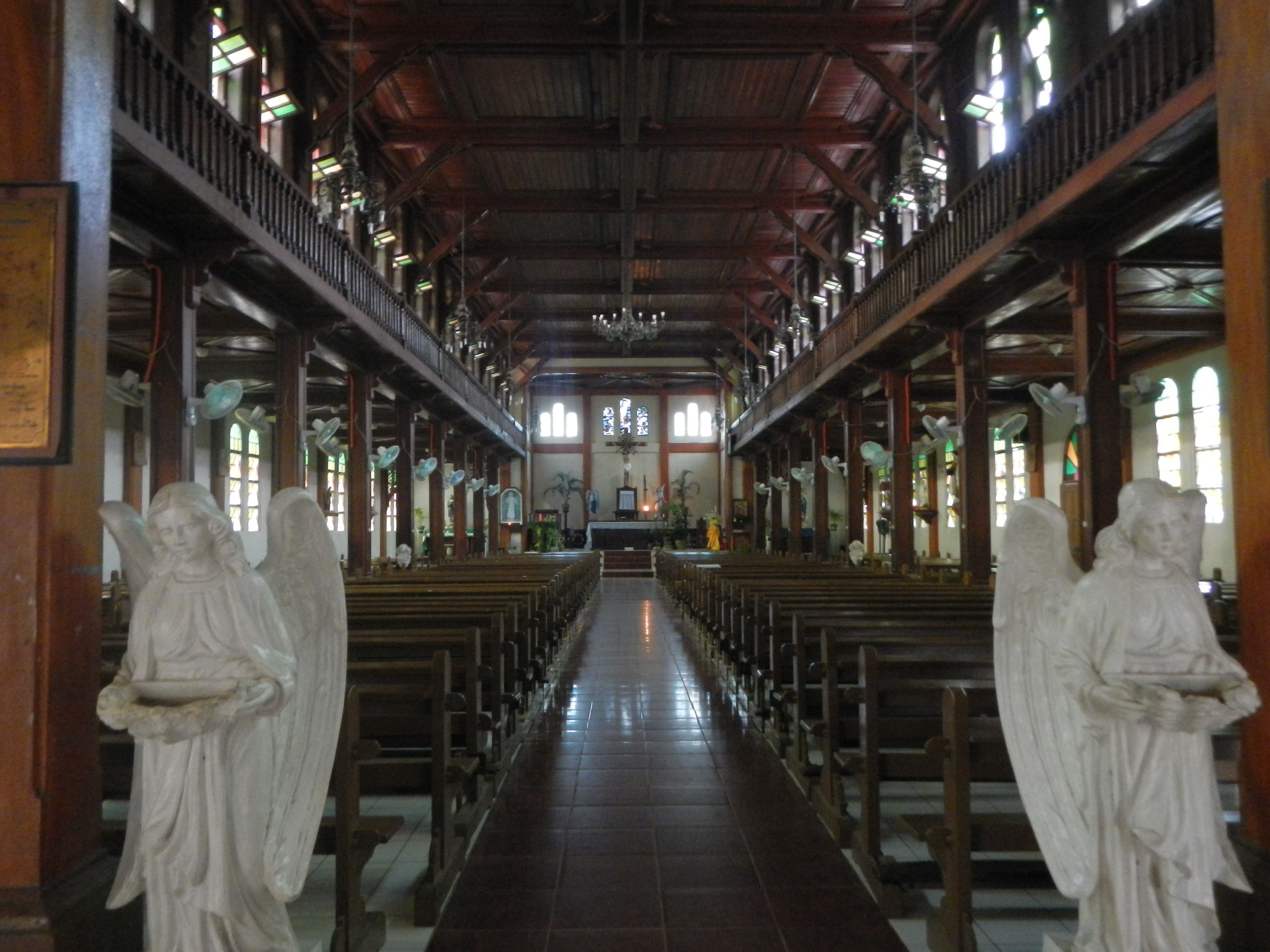
Inside of St. Isidore the Farmer Parish Church

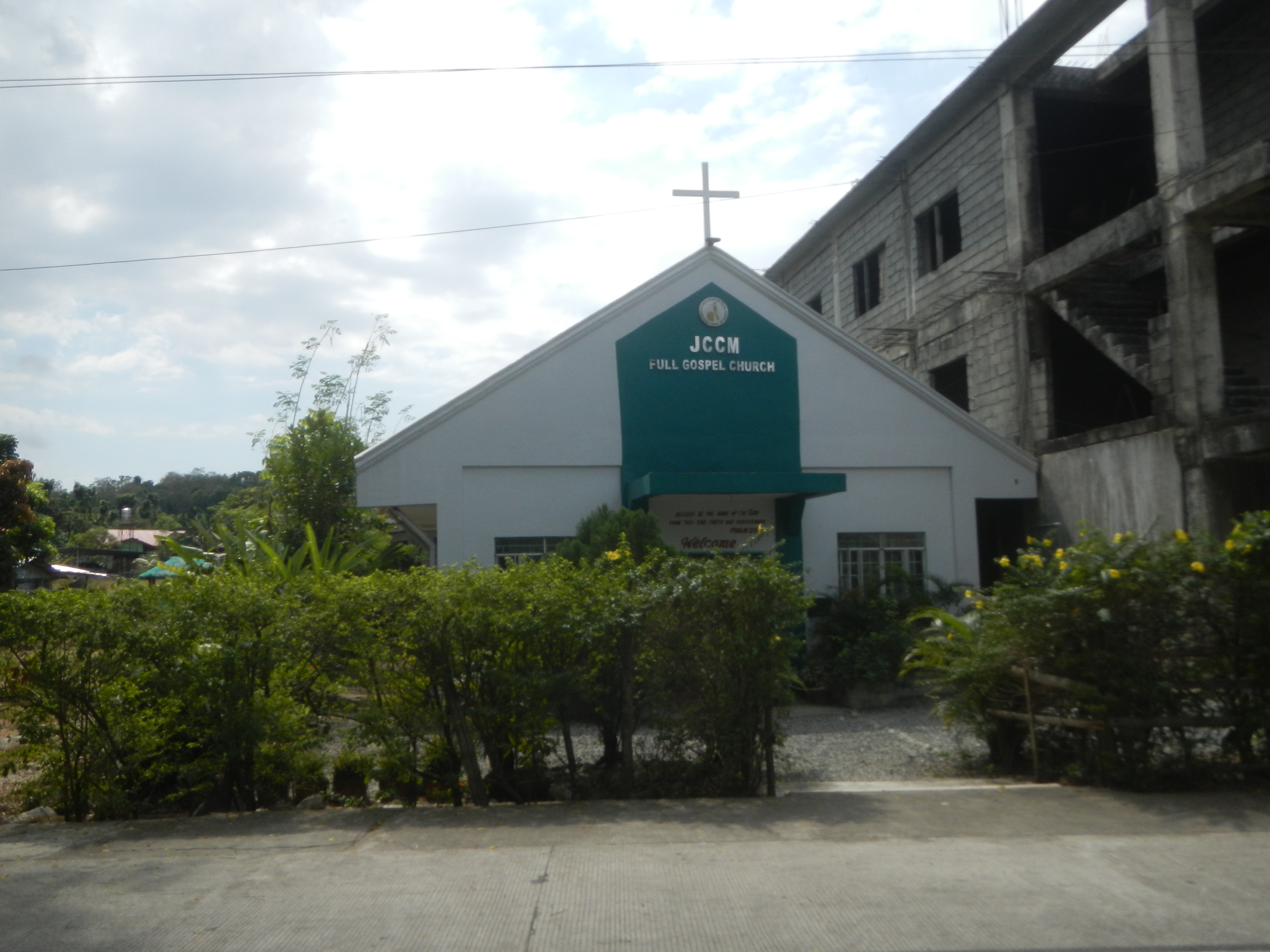
The City of Champions Full Gospel Church of Tubao

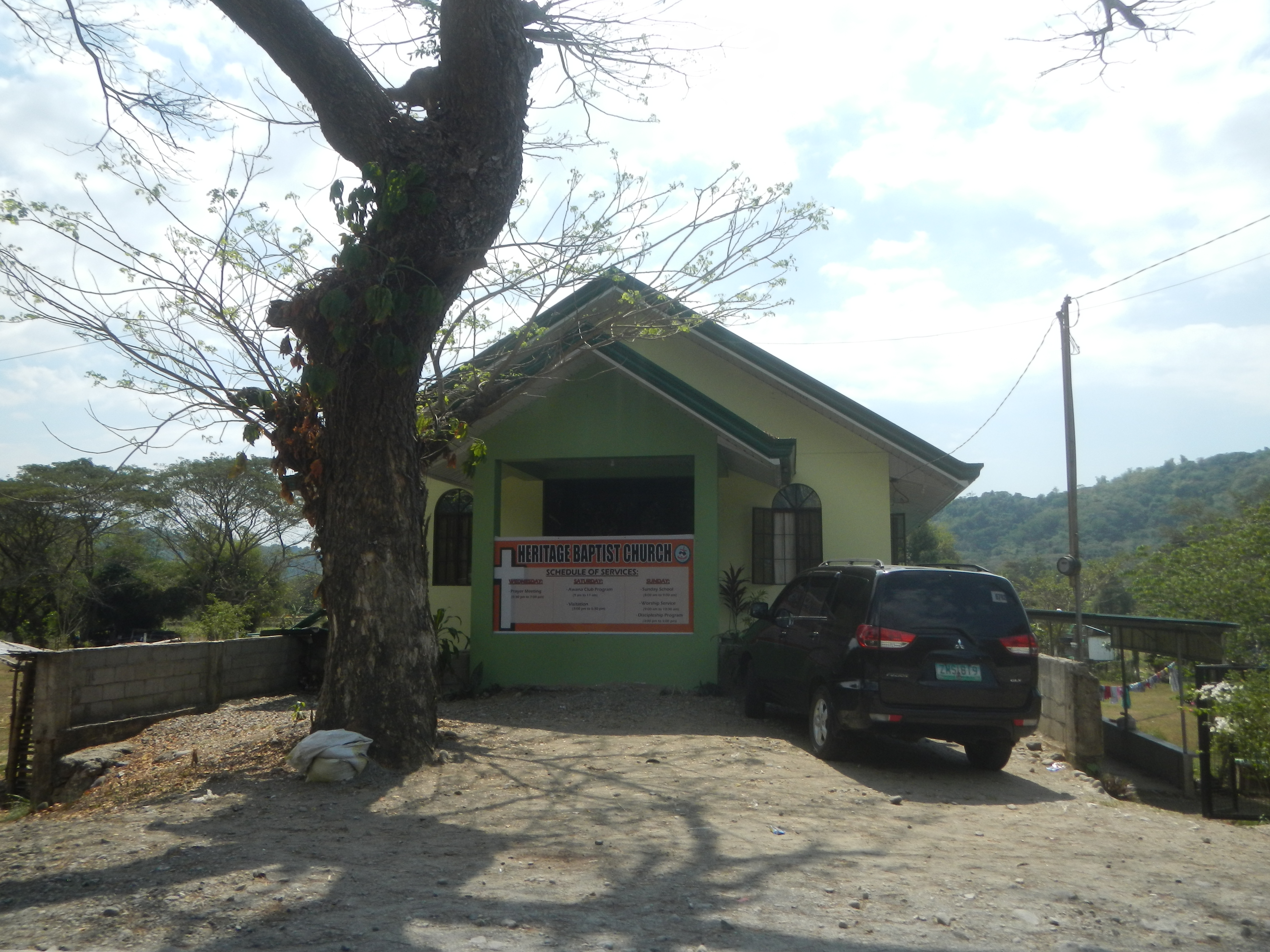
Heritage Baptist Church

Tubao is predominantly Roman Catholic, with significant numbers adhering to other Christian denominations such as Iglesia ni Cristo, Protestantism, Aglipayan, Pentecostal, and Jehovah’s Witnesses. The municipality is also home to smaller religious communities, including those practicing Islam and Buddhism.

== Education ==
The Tubao Schools District Office governs all educational institutions within the municipality. It oversees the management and operations of all private and public elementary and high schools.

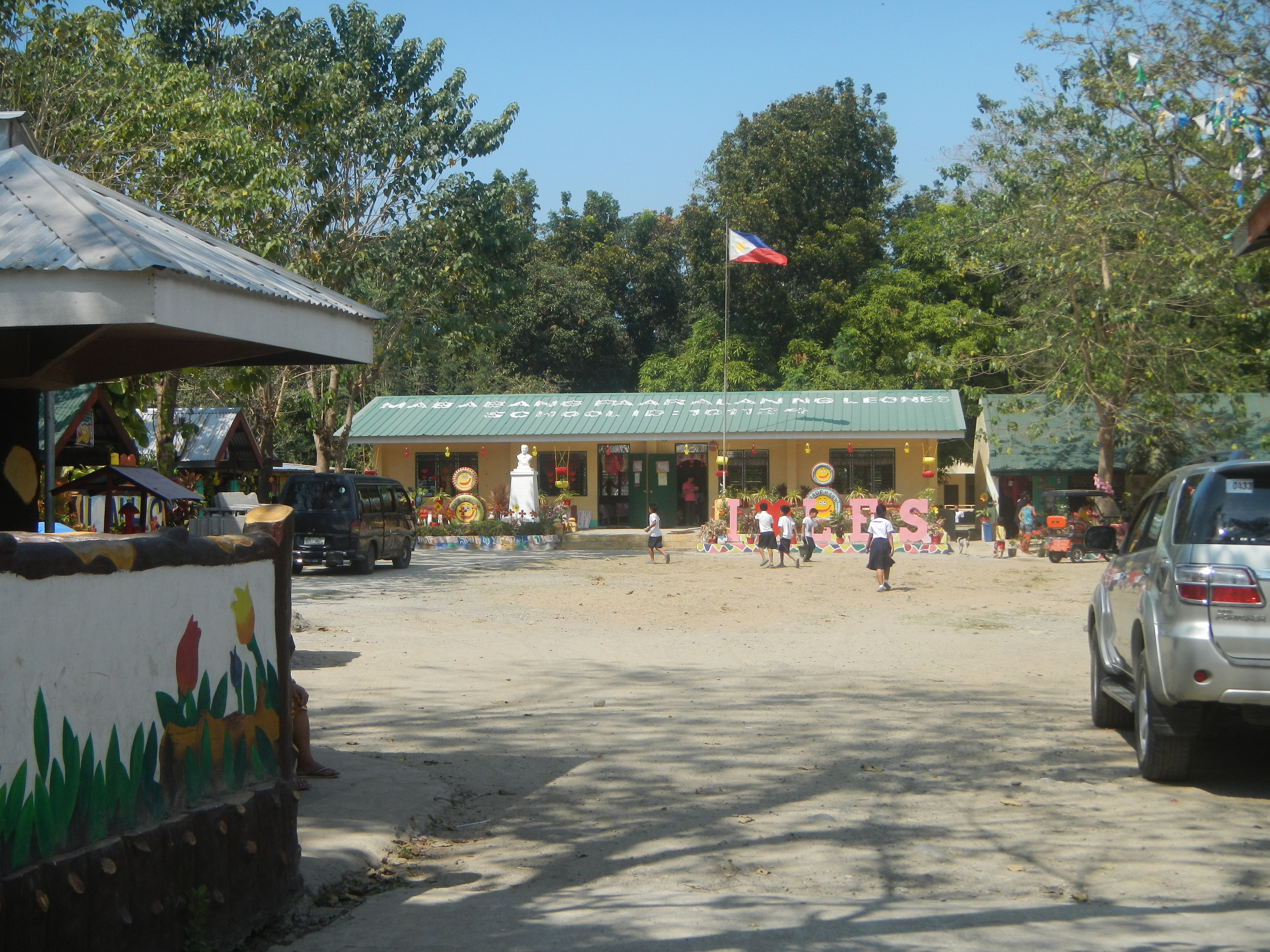
Leones Elementary School

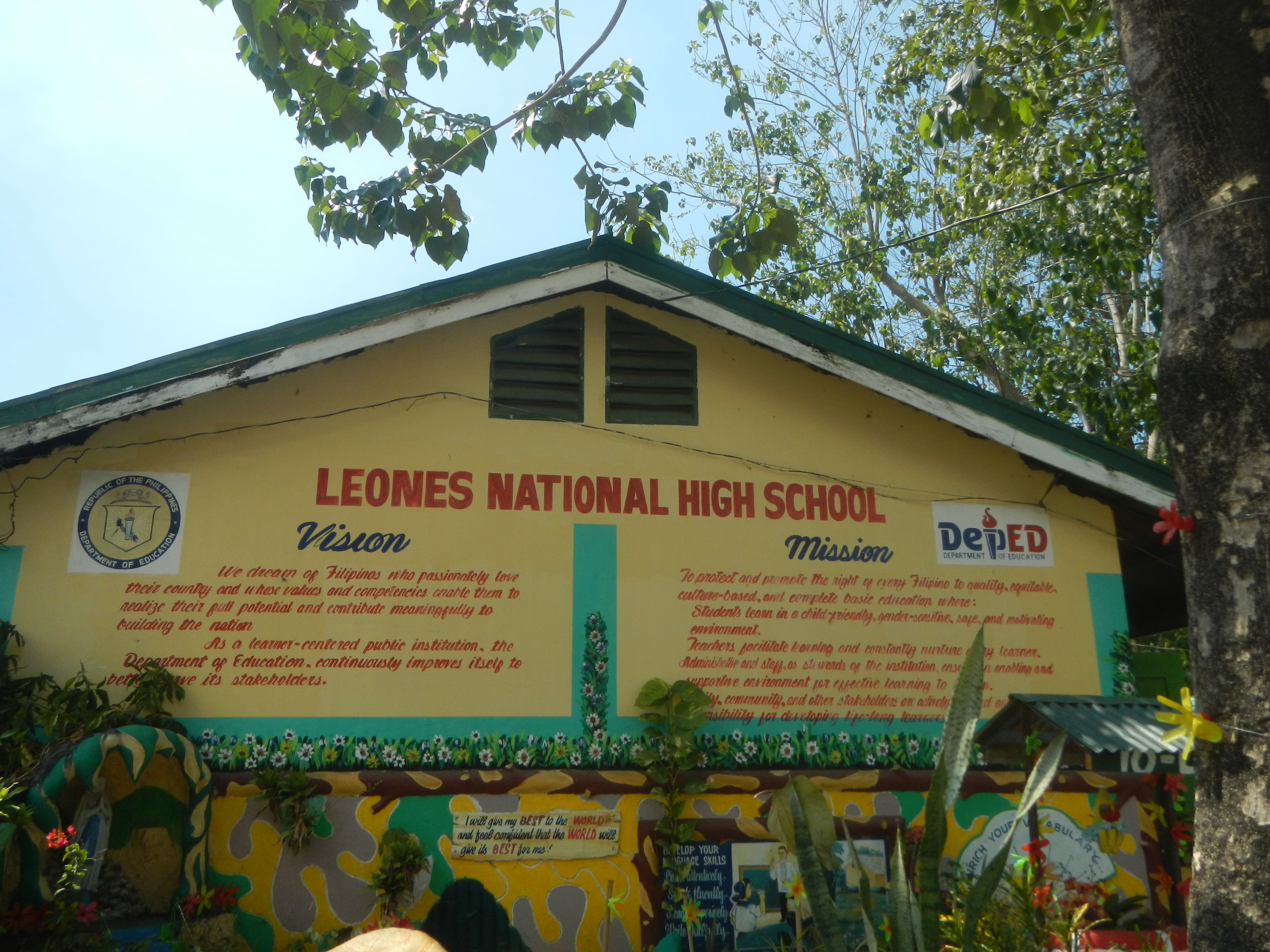
Leones National Highschool

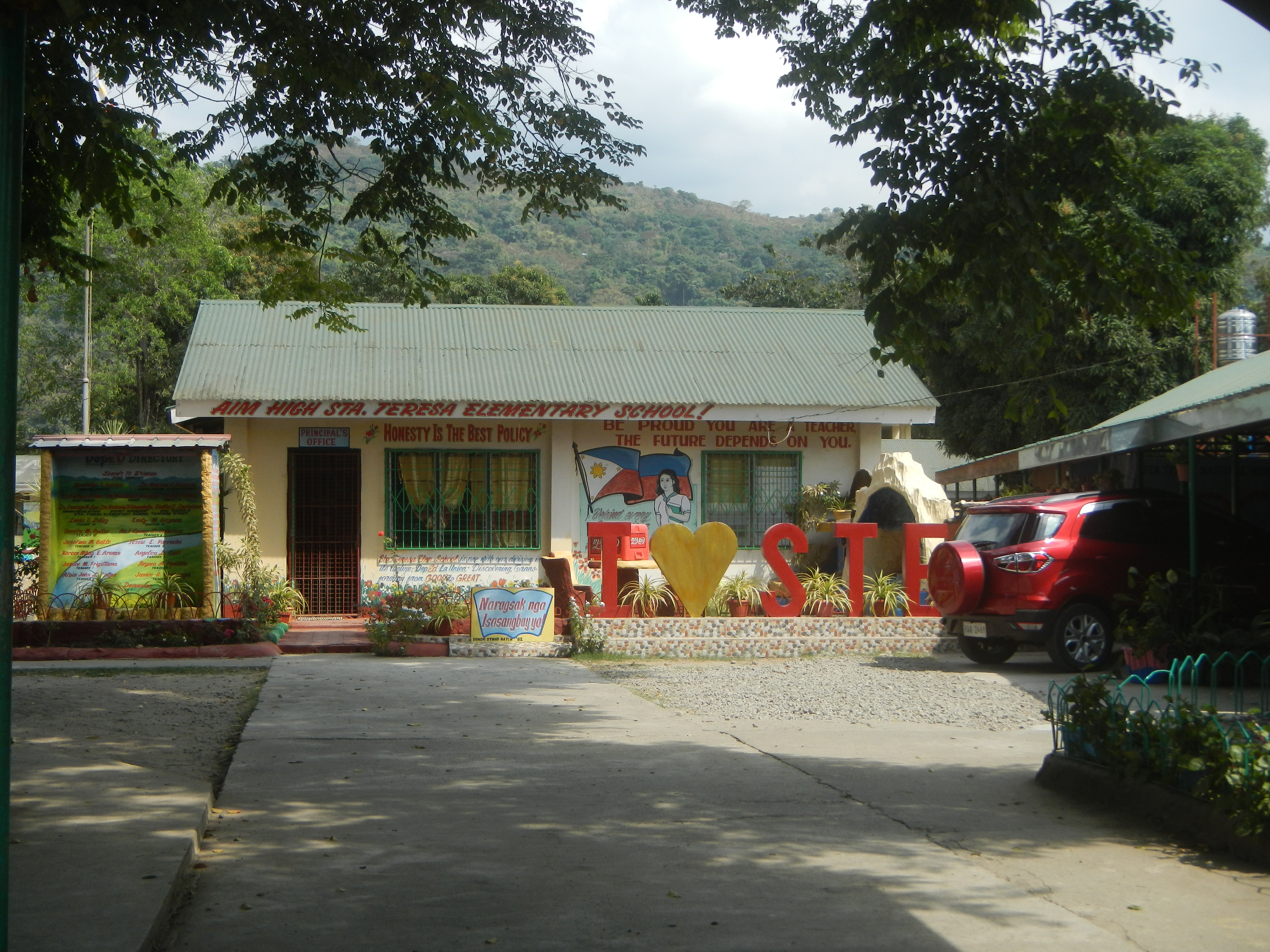
Sta. Teresa Elementary School

Among the household population aged five years and older, 25.30 percent had attended or completed elementary education, while 44.79 percent had reached or finished high school. Additionally, 9.15 percent were college undergraduates, and 14.71 percent were degree holders. Among those with academic degrees, 57.73 percent were females, and 42.27 percent were males. Similarly, more females (67.01 percent) than males (32.99 percent) pursued post-baccalaureate studies.

The literacy rate in Tubao was recorded at 99.27 percent among the 29,258 household population aged five years and over, with a slightly higher rate among males (51.10 percent) compared to females (48.90 percent).

Tubao has 15 public elementary schools and 6 public secondary schools.

=== Primary and elementary schools ===
- Amallapay Elementary School
- Anduyan Elementary School
- Caoigue Elementary School
- Daeng Elementary School
- Francia Sur Elementary School
- Gonzales Elementary School
- Halog East Elementary School
- Halog West Elementary School
- Leones Elementary School
- Linapew Elementary School
- Lloren Elementary School
- Pideg Elementary school
- Rizal Elementary School
- St. Isidore School
- Sta. Teresa Elementary School
- Tubao Central School
- UCCP Tubao Nursery Kindergarten

=== Secondary schools ===
- Anduyan National High School
- Don Rufino Olarte Memorial National High School
- Halog West National High School
- Leones National High School
- Sta. Teresa National High School
- Tubao National High School
- San Alberto Magno Academy

== Economy ==
Tubao is a fourth-class income municipality with a poverty incidence of 10.75%, steadily progressing through its reliance on agriculture, cottage industries, services, and its strategic role as a gateway to eco-tourism and trade.

Poverty incidence of Tubao (%)

Source: Philippine Statistics Authority

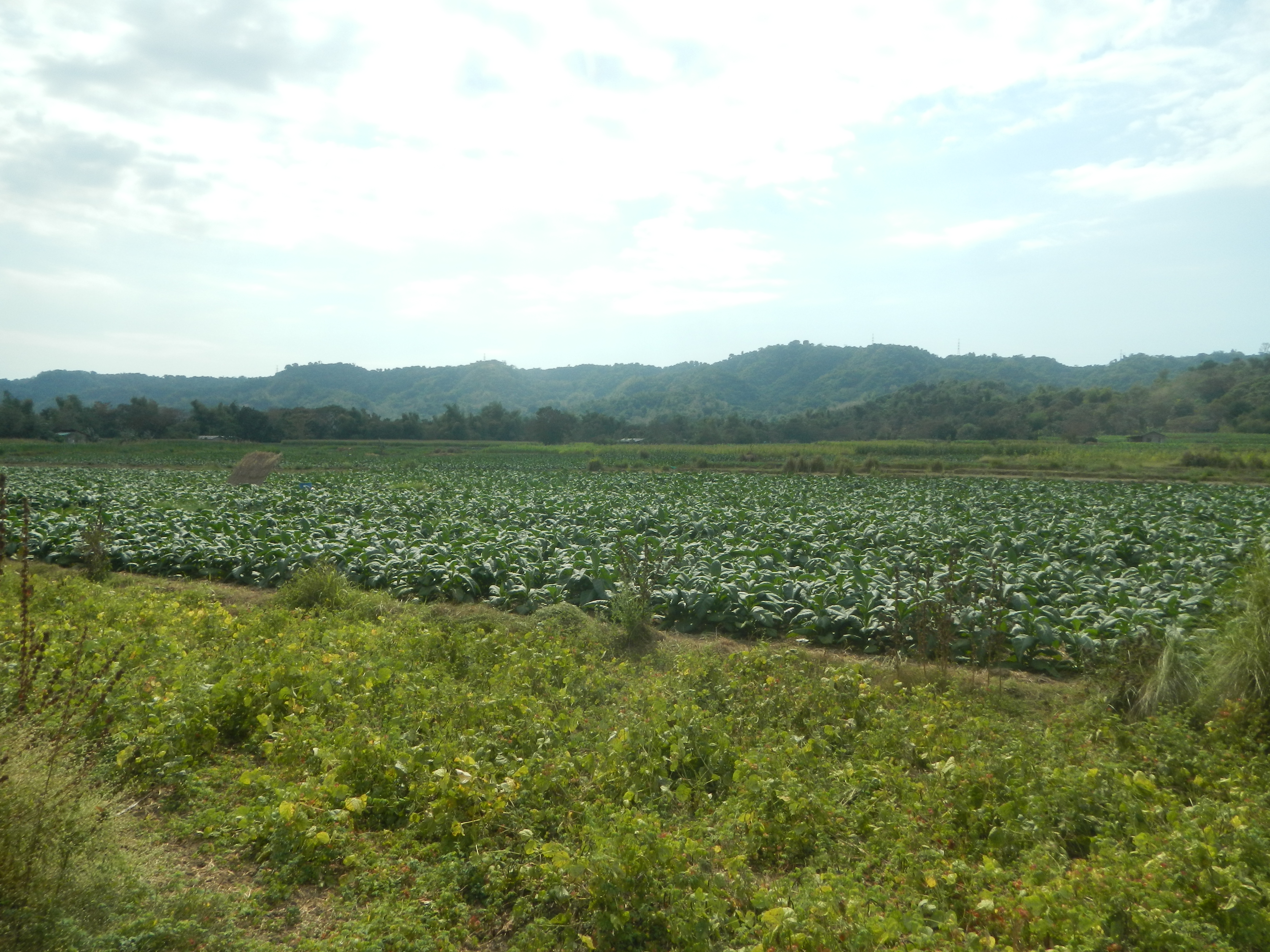
Tobacco field in Sta. Teresa

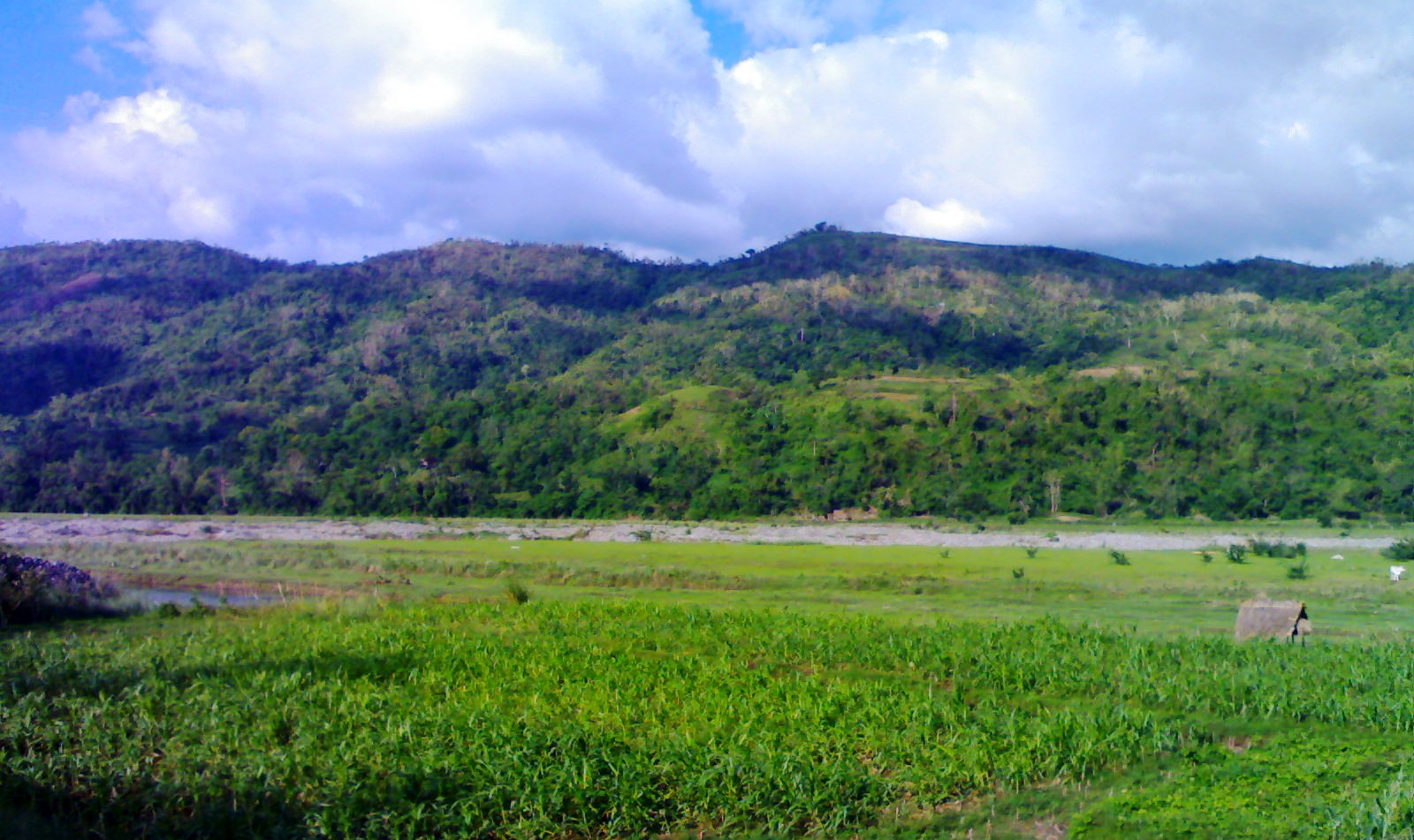
Maize field in Tubao

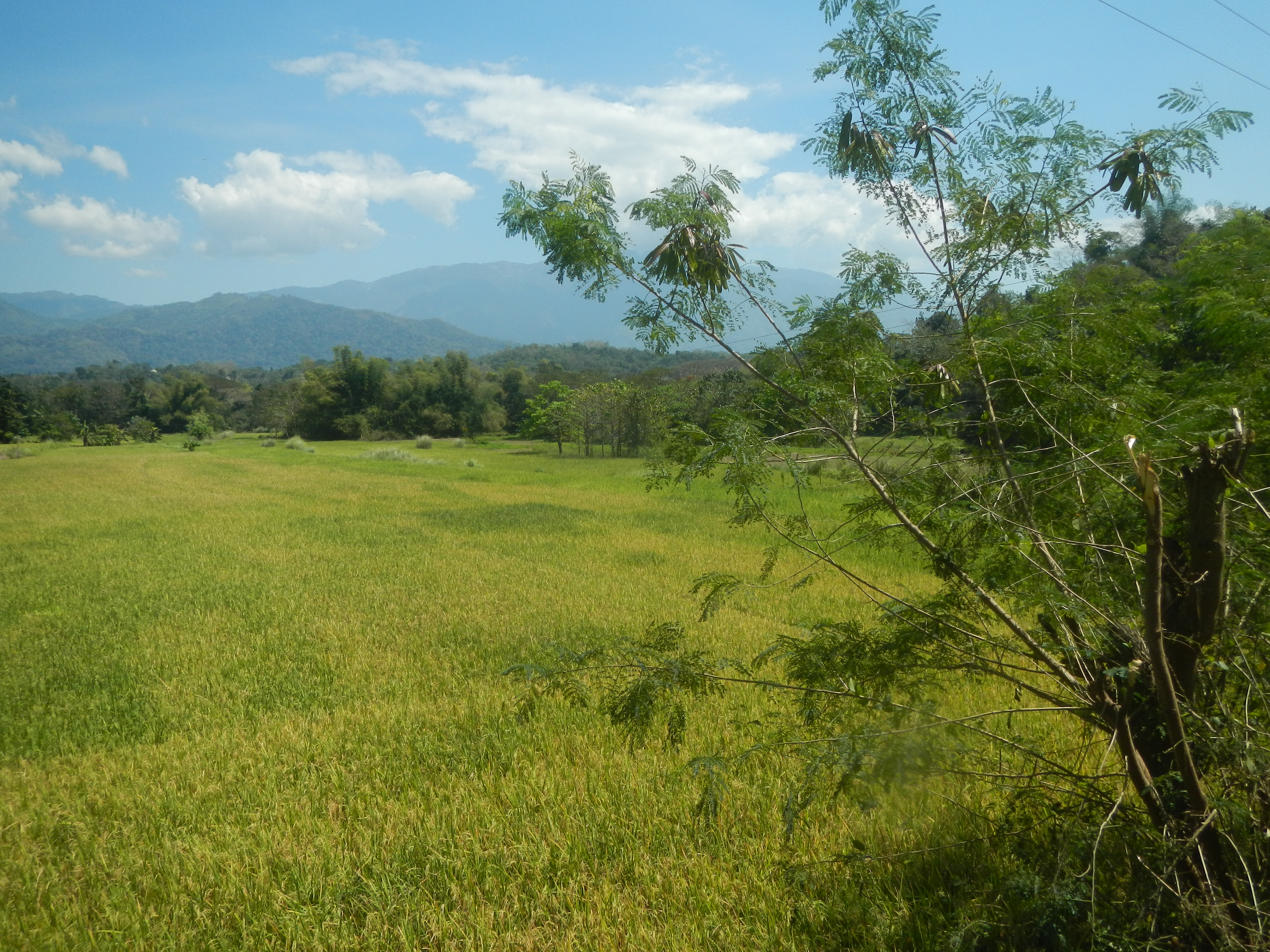
Paddy field in Francia Sur

=== Agriculture ===
In terms of agriculture, the town's major crops include rice, tobacco, corn, root crops, fruits such banana and vegetables. Known as the “Home of Native Tobacco,” Tubao was once renowned for its high-quality tobacco leaves and cigars. For decades, the town flourished with a thriving tobacco trade, its center bustling with large warehouses and trading posts.

Aside from tobacco, green corn serves as a vital cash crop planted after the rice harvest. With a short maturity period of 60–70 days, farmers can grow two corn crops annually. The marketing process is often carried out through the “pakyaw” system, where buyers directly visit the farms and handle harvesting and packaging. During the second cropping season, when demand for green corn declines, farmers allow the corn to mature. This matured corn is later processed into products like “cornik” and other delicacies.

=== Livestock ===
Livestock farming is prominent in Tubao, taking advantage of its expansive plains. Farmers raise cattle, poultry, swine, goats, and carabaos. These animals not only provide meat and dairy products but are also used for labor and transport in agricultural activities.

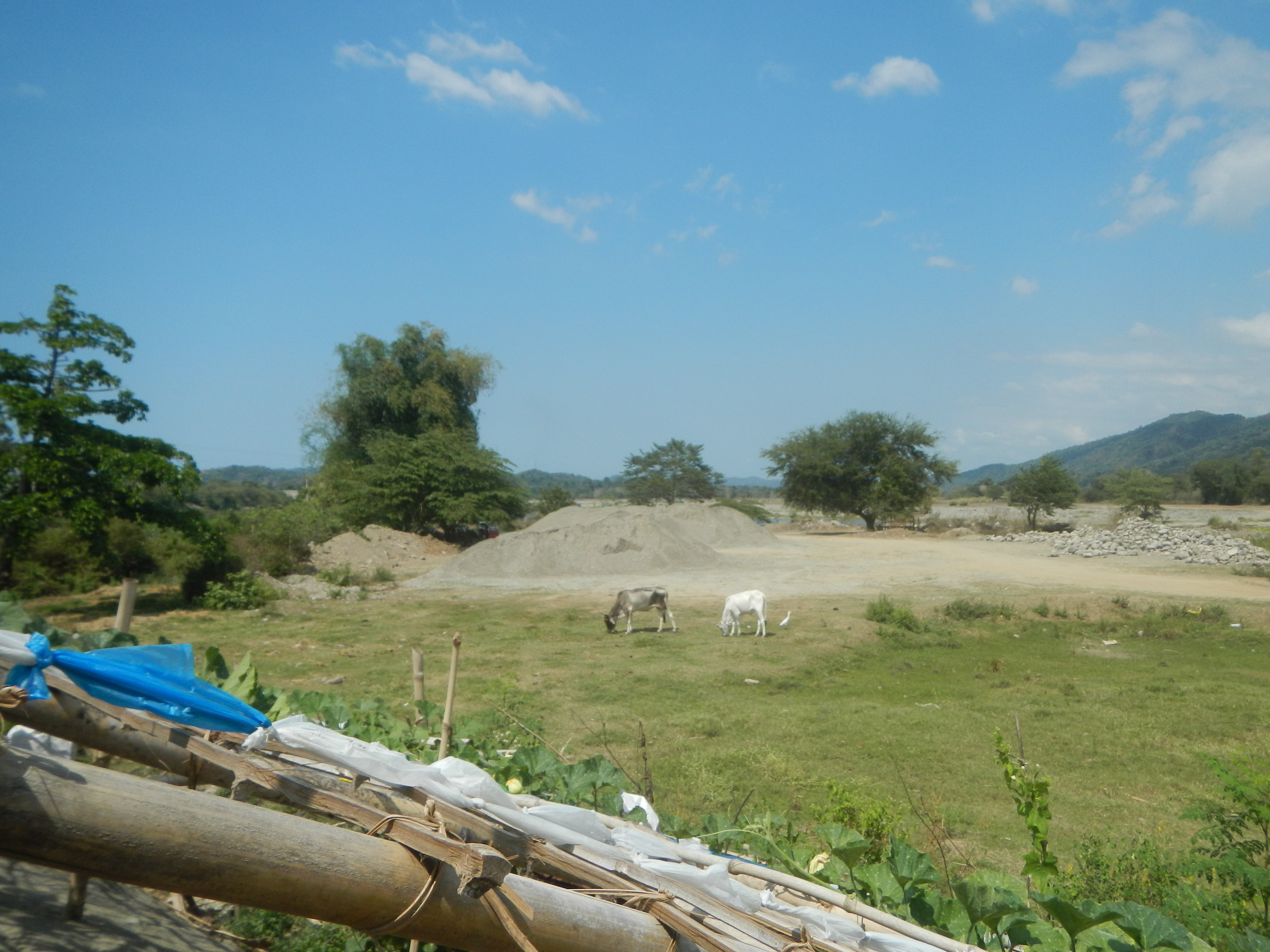
Cordillera terrains in Rizal

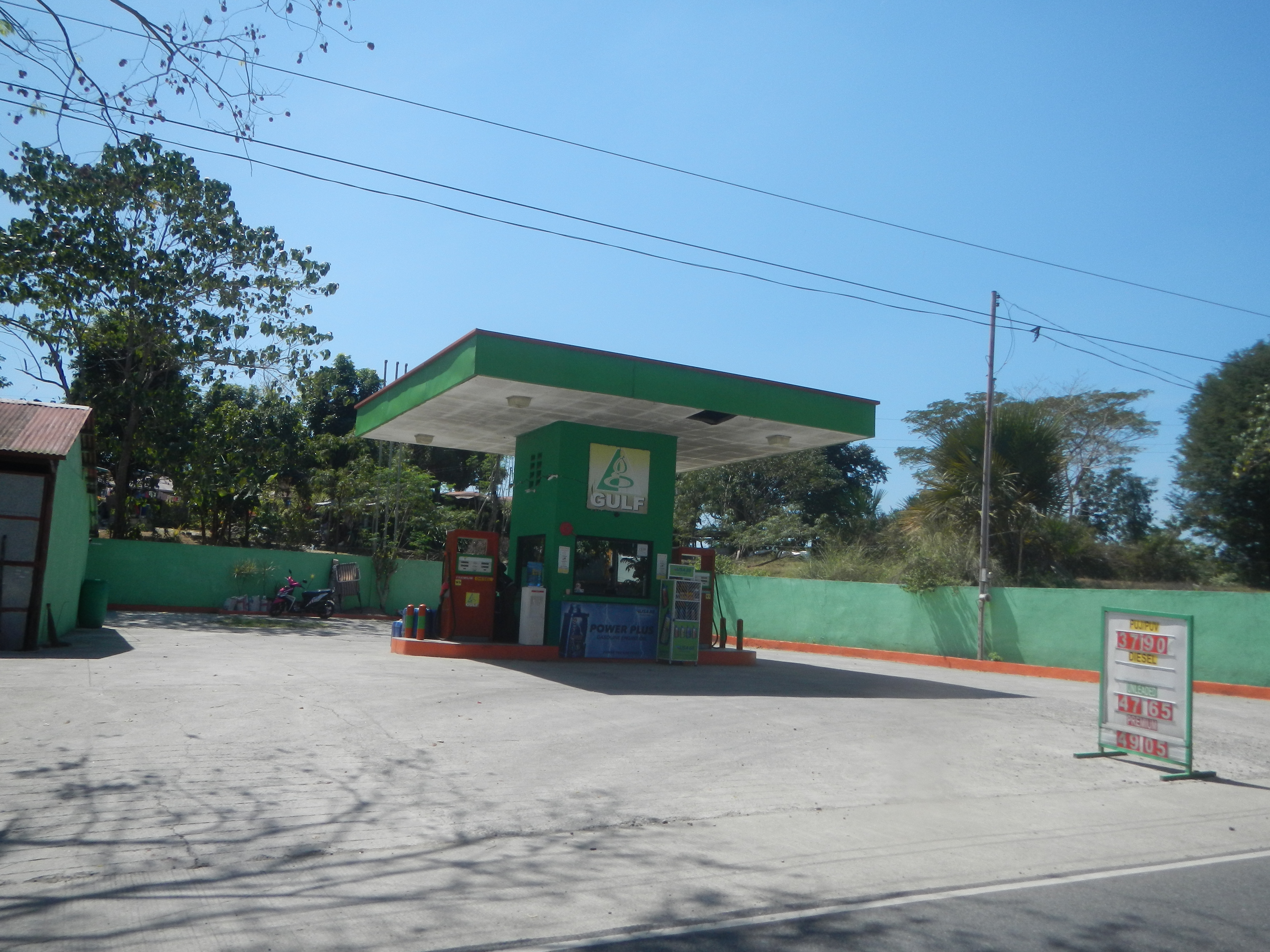
Local gas station

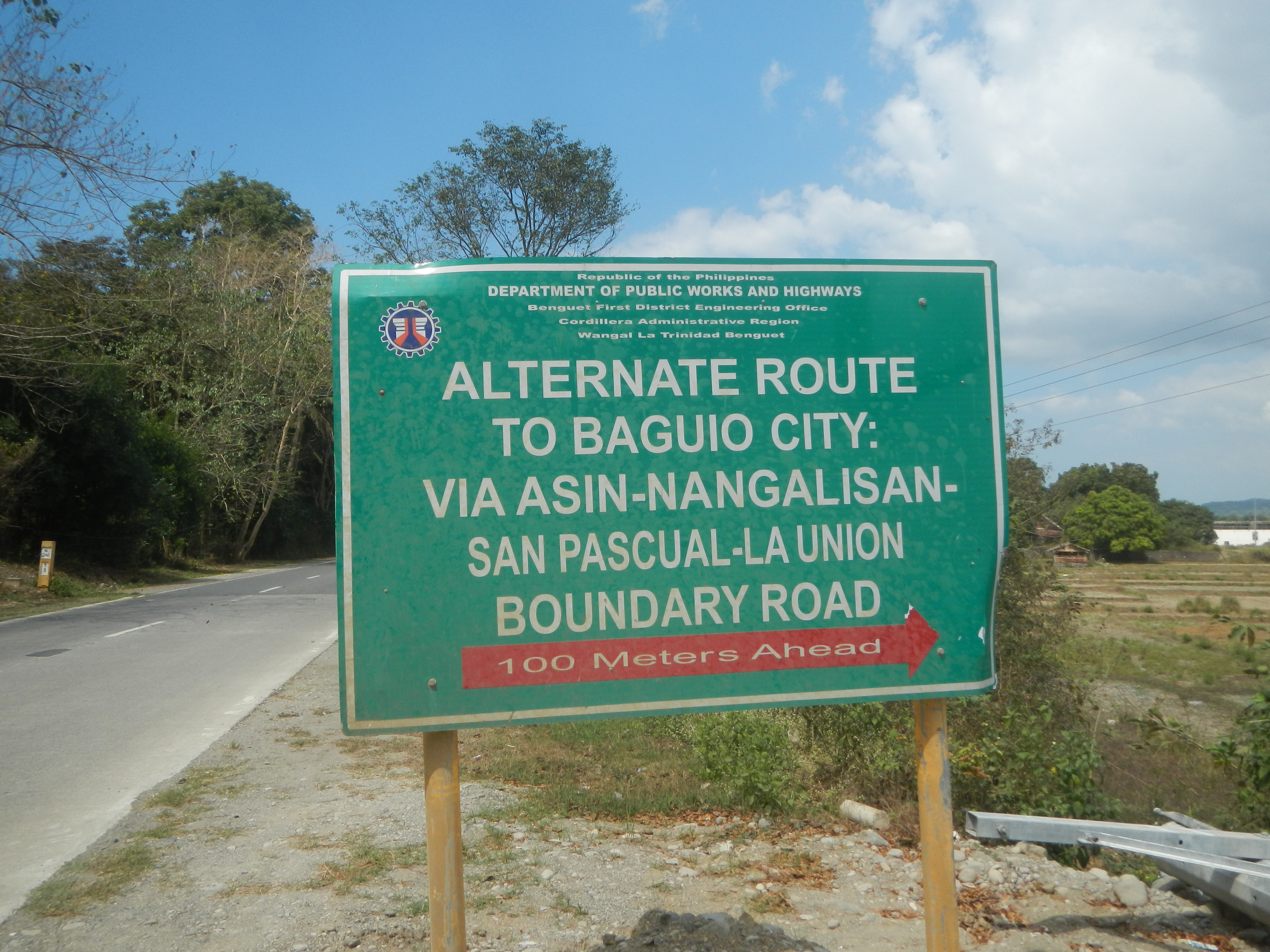
Anduyan-Nangalisan-Asin Road

=== Cottage Industries ===
Tubao supports a variety of small-scale industries, including the production of processed green corn, such as “chichacorn,” and banana chips, which are popular as “pasalubong” (souvenirs) for visitors. Basketry made from bamboo and woodcarving for furniture-making are traditional cottage industries that remain active, showcasing the town's craftsmanship.

=== Small Enterprises ===
The town proper is home to numerous small enterprises, including trading businesses, sari-sari stores, and small restaurants, all of which contribute to the local economy. Tubao’s economic activities create a modest but dynamic business environment that caters to both residents and visitors.

=== Tourism ===
Tubao is gradually emerging as a tourist destination, offering natural attractions and scenic landscapes. Two waterfalls—Sangbay Falls and Lang-ay Falls—are among the town's most visited spots. In addition, Tubao is an access point for the Anduyan-Nangalisan-Asin Road, an alternative route to Baguio City. This scenic road offers views and is less congested compared to the traditional route.

== Government ==
=== Local Government ===
Just as the national government, the municipal government of Tubao, is divided into three branches: executive, legislative and judiciary. The judicial branch is administered solely by the Supreme Court of the Philippines. The LGUs have control of the executive and legislative branch.

The executive branch is composed of the mayor and the barangay captain for the barangays.

The legislative branch is composed of the Sangguniang Bayan (town assembly), Sangguniang Barangay (barangay council), and the Sangguniang Kabataan for the youth sector.

The seat of Government is vested upon the Mayor and other elected officers who hold office at the Tubao Town hall. The Sanguniang Bayan is the center of legislation, stationed in Tubao Municipio.

=== Elected officials ===
Members of the Municipal Council (2019–2022)
Position	Name
Congressman	Dante S. Garcia
Mayor	Jonalyn G. Fontanilla-Piayas
Vice-Mayor	Wilfredo S. Garcia
Councilors	Marilou G. Bulao
Councilors	Mary Muriel M. Verceles
Councilors	Domingo S. Estoesta
Councilors	Dominga R. Caburian
Councilors	Michael M. Mapalo
Councilors	Estela M. Gayo
Councilors	Joseph G. Quimado
Councilors	William F. Mariñas

=== List of Former Chief Executives ===
For 378 years, from 1521 to 1899, Local Chief Executives of the “pueblos” or towns were appointed by the Spaniards and in the year 1901 up to 1910 they were appointed by the Americans. Afterwards, election was the mode of selection.

Early local government was covered by the Maura Law which was passed in 1893 that changed the title or designation of town heads from gobernadorcillo to capitan municipal. It was ruled by the members of the Tribunal Municipal, the "cabezas de barangay" and the "principales" (the local oligarchy as delegates), who elect the members of the Tribunal Council.

The following local officials held the positions either as Tenientes Absolute Gobernadorcillos, Capitanes, Presidentes Municipal and Municipal Mayors, for the terms opposite their respective names:

Gobernadorcillos

- Don Felipe Lloren 1886-1889 (appointed)
- Don Carlos Orencia Gonzales 1890-1891 (appointed)

Capitan Municipal/Alcalde

- Don Buenaventura Dacanay 1892-1893 (appointed)
- Don Santiago Fontanilla 1894-1895 (appointed)
- Don Miguel Halog 1896-1897 (appointed)
- Don Catalino Zarate 1898-1899 (appointed)
- Don Santiago Fontanilla 1899-1900 (appointed)
- Don Teodorico Asprer 1901-1902 (appointed)
- Don Ambrocio Oribello 1902-1903 (appointed)
- Don Dionisio Tabora 1904-1906 (appointed)
- Don Fabian Fangonil 1907-1908 (appointed)
- Don Dionisio Tabora 1909 (appointed)

Presidente Municipal

- Don Feliciano Zarate 1910-1912
- Don Vicente Estolas 1913-1916
- Don Juan Verceles 1916-1919
- Don Marcos Acosta 1919-1921
- Don Isabelo Leones 1921-1925
- Don Calixto Lloren 1925-1928
- Don Basilio Halog 1928-1934
- Don Mariano Viloria 1934-1937
- Don Basilio Halog 1938-1942
- Don Emilio Laroya 1942-1944 (appointed)
- Don Gregorio Mapalo 1944-1945 (appointed)
- Don Basilio Halog 1945-1946 (appointed)

Municipal Mayor

- Francisco Quesada 1946-1947 (appointed)
- Gregorio Mapalo 1947-1951
- Florencio Baltazar, Sr. 1951-1967
- Lorenzo Baltazar 1967-1971
- Antonio Verceles 1971-1986
- Conrado Baltazar 1986-1987 (appointed)
- Arcadio Diaz II Dec. 1987-Feb. 1988 (interim)
- Antonio Verceles 1988-1998
- Violeta Verceles 1998-2004
- Dante Garcia 2004-2013
- Jonalyn Fontanilla 2013-2016
- Dante Garcia 2016-2019
- Jonalyn Fontanilla 2019-present

=== Municipal Town Halls ===
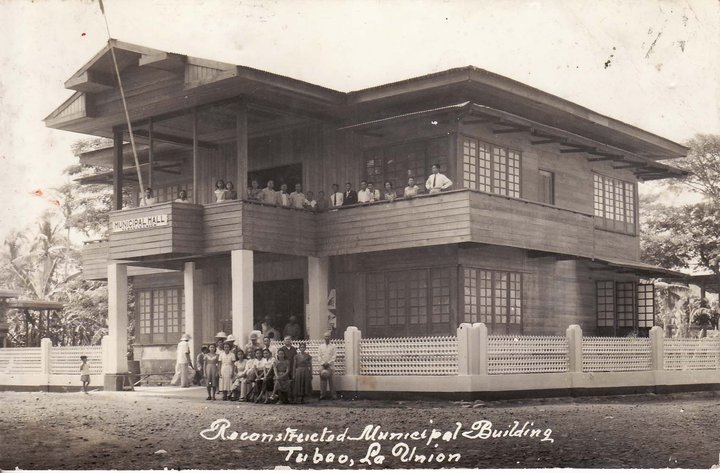
Tubao Municipal Building, built in the late 1940s under the incumbency of Mayor Gregorio Mapalo, Sr. and lasted until the early 1960s.

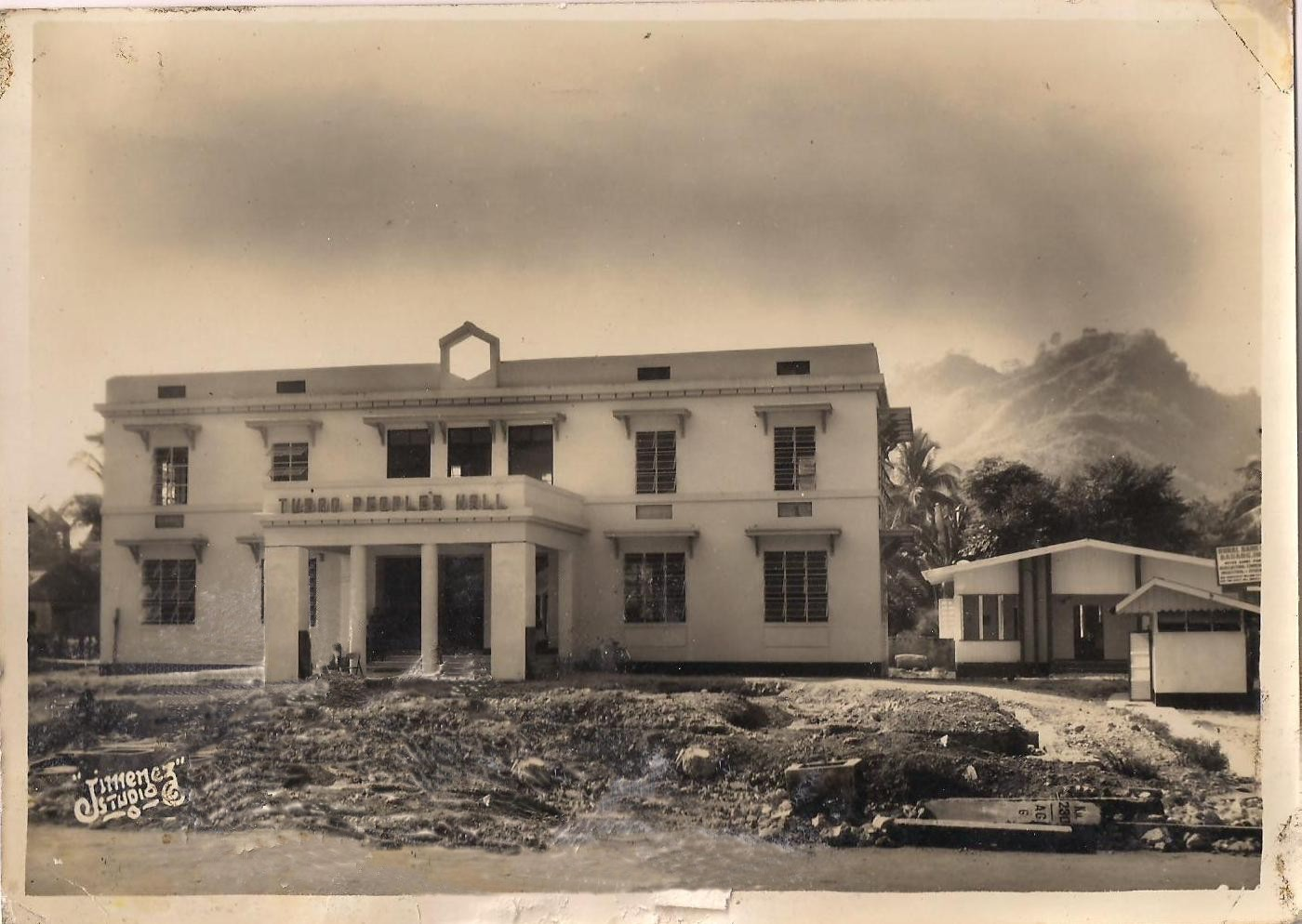
Tubao Municipal Building (the Moncada Model), under construction in the early 1960s during the incumbency of Mayor Florencio Baltazar, Sr. The building was destroyed during the July 16, 1990, earthquake.

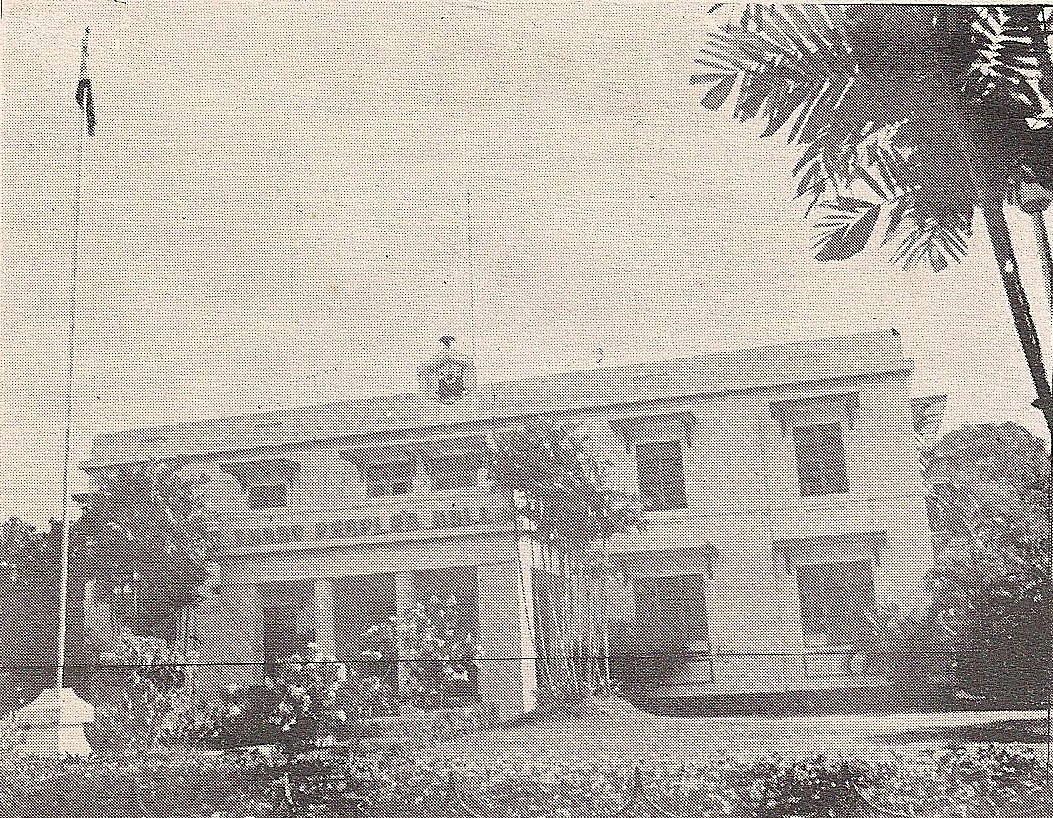
The Moncada Model in its pristine state.

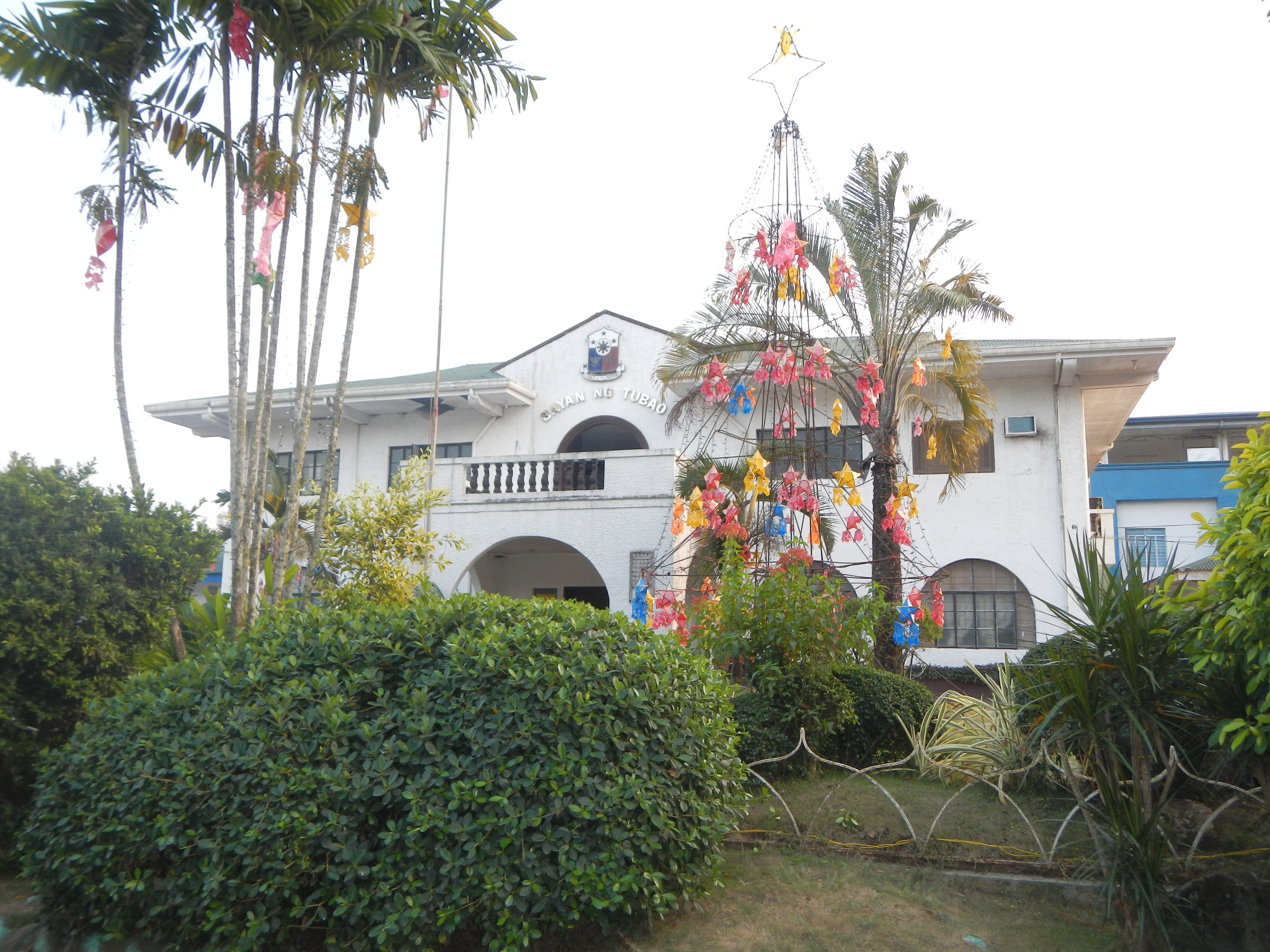
Municipal Hall in 2012

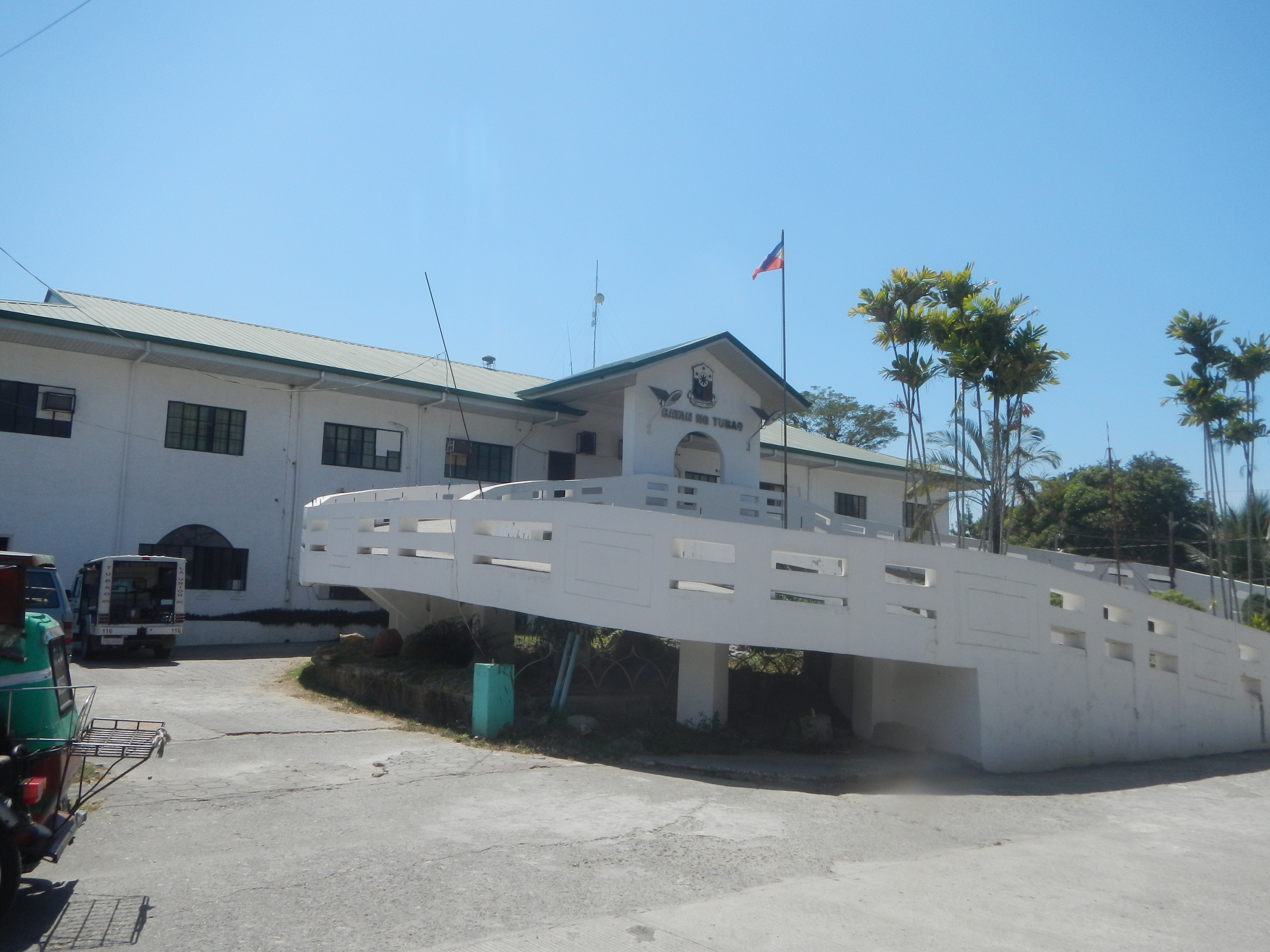
Current Municipal Hall (2020)

=== Politics ===
==== 2012 assassination attempt ====
Tubao Mayor Dante Garcia survived an assassination attack when he escaped unscathed from an ambush early on September 9, 2012, along the Aspiras National Highway in Barangay Lloren, Tubao. But Attorney Lazaro Gayo, a former vice mayor of the town and an aspiring candidate for Sangguniang Panlalawigan was murdered.

The Civil Society Group (CSG) and the La Union police therefore held a rally at Freedom Park in Agoo to protest the series of unsolved extrajudicial killings in Tubao and Agoo. The public indignation was led by Reverend Mariano C. Apilado of Peace Builders La Union, Melvin Macusi of Amnesty International, Danilo Balino from the Commission on Human Rights and Fr. Leo Nedic of TIGNAY-PPCRV, other human rights Groups, Kanlungan, Bannuar and leaders of the Catholic and Protestant Churches.

== Gallery ==
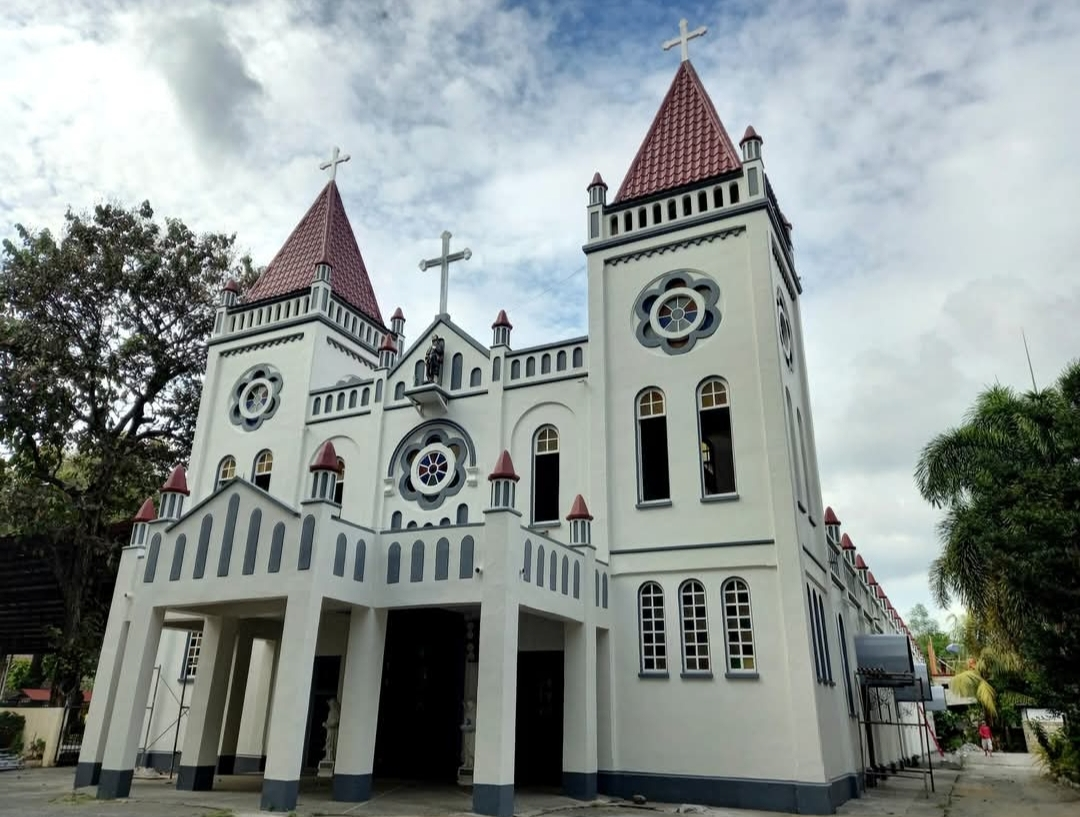
The Facade of St. Isidore the Farmer Parish Church (2025)

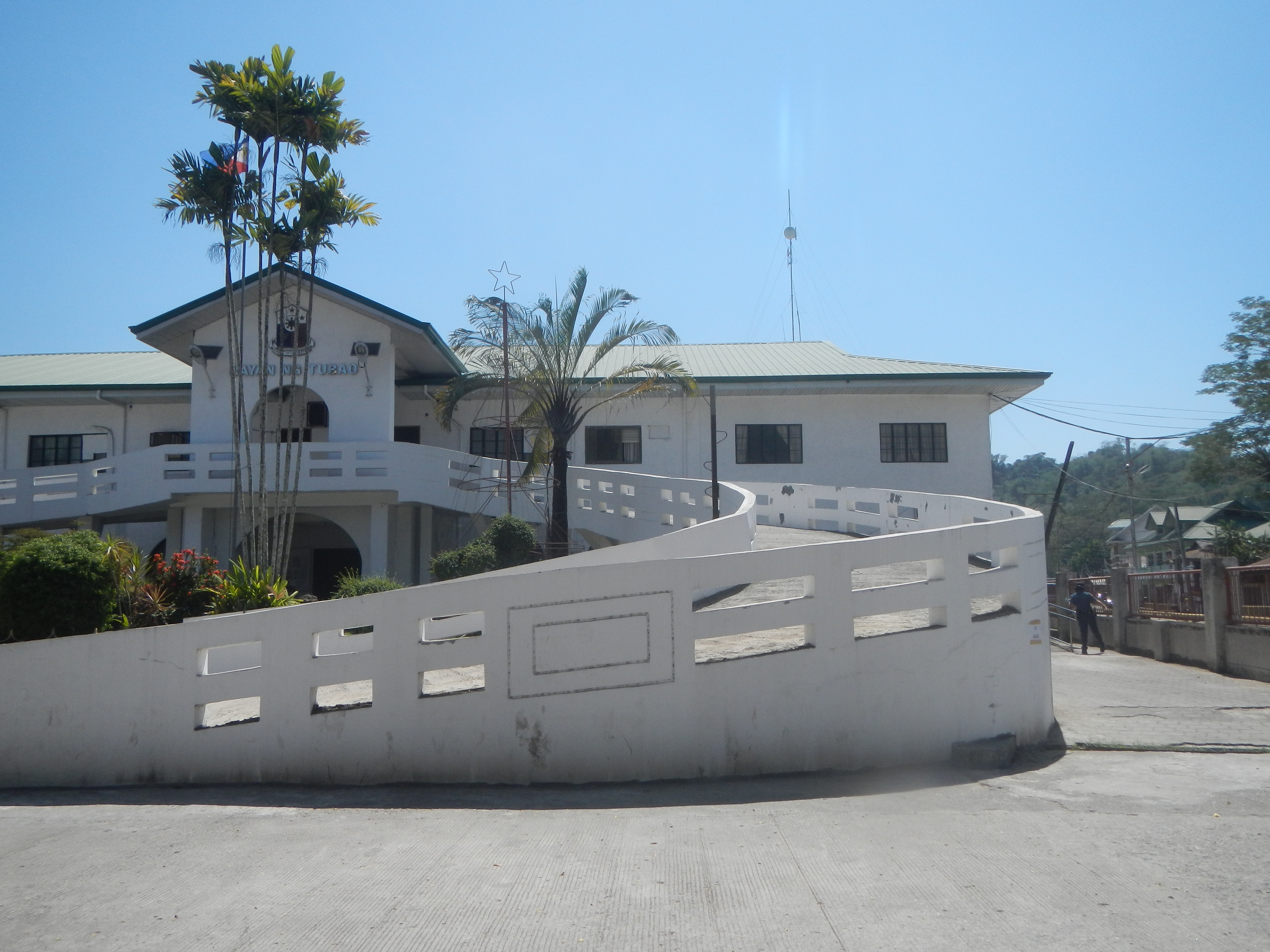
Facade of Municipal Hall

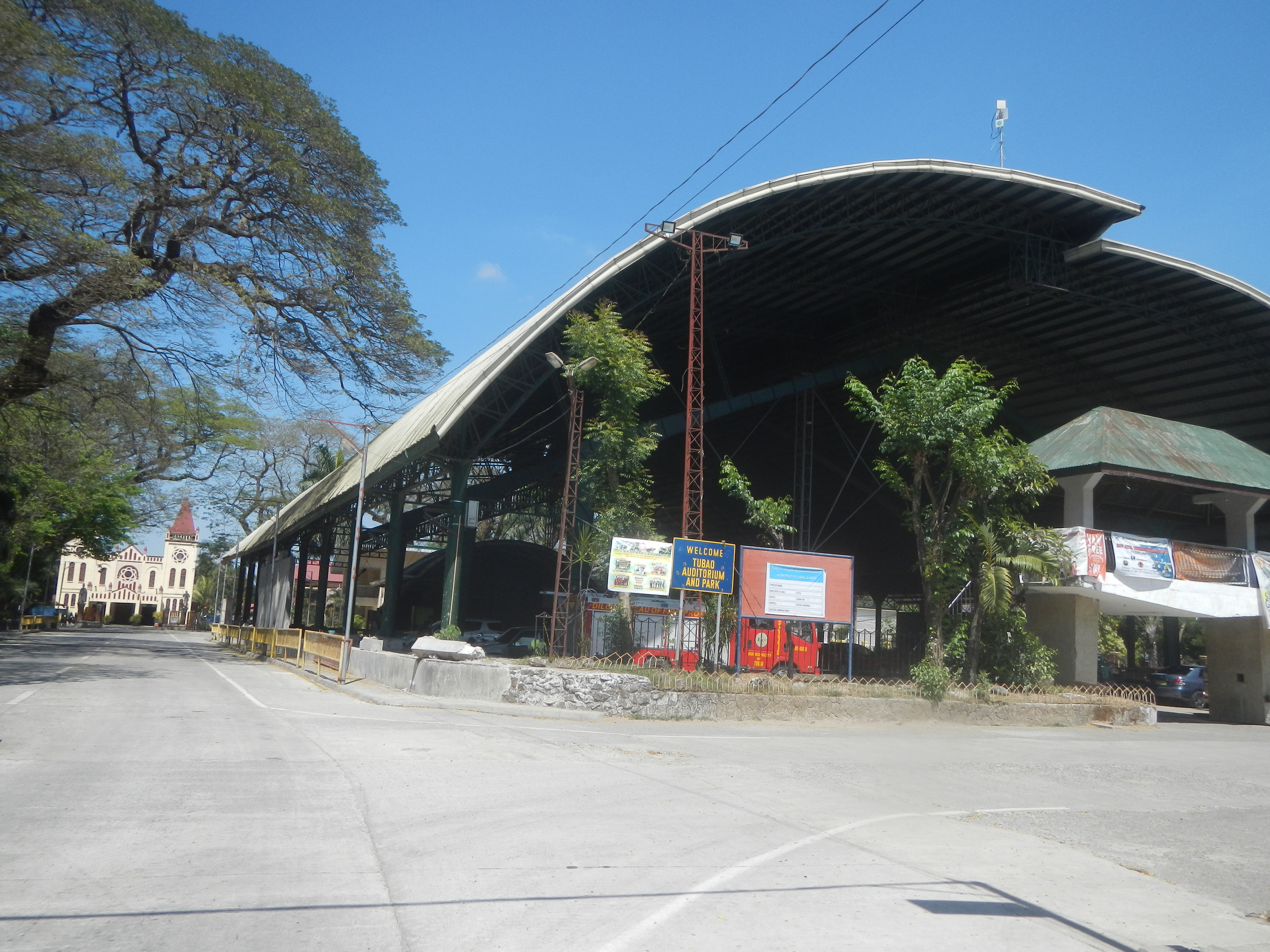
Tubao Civic Center

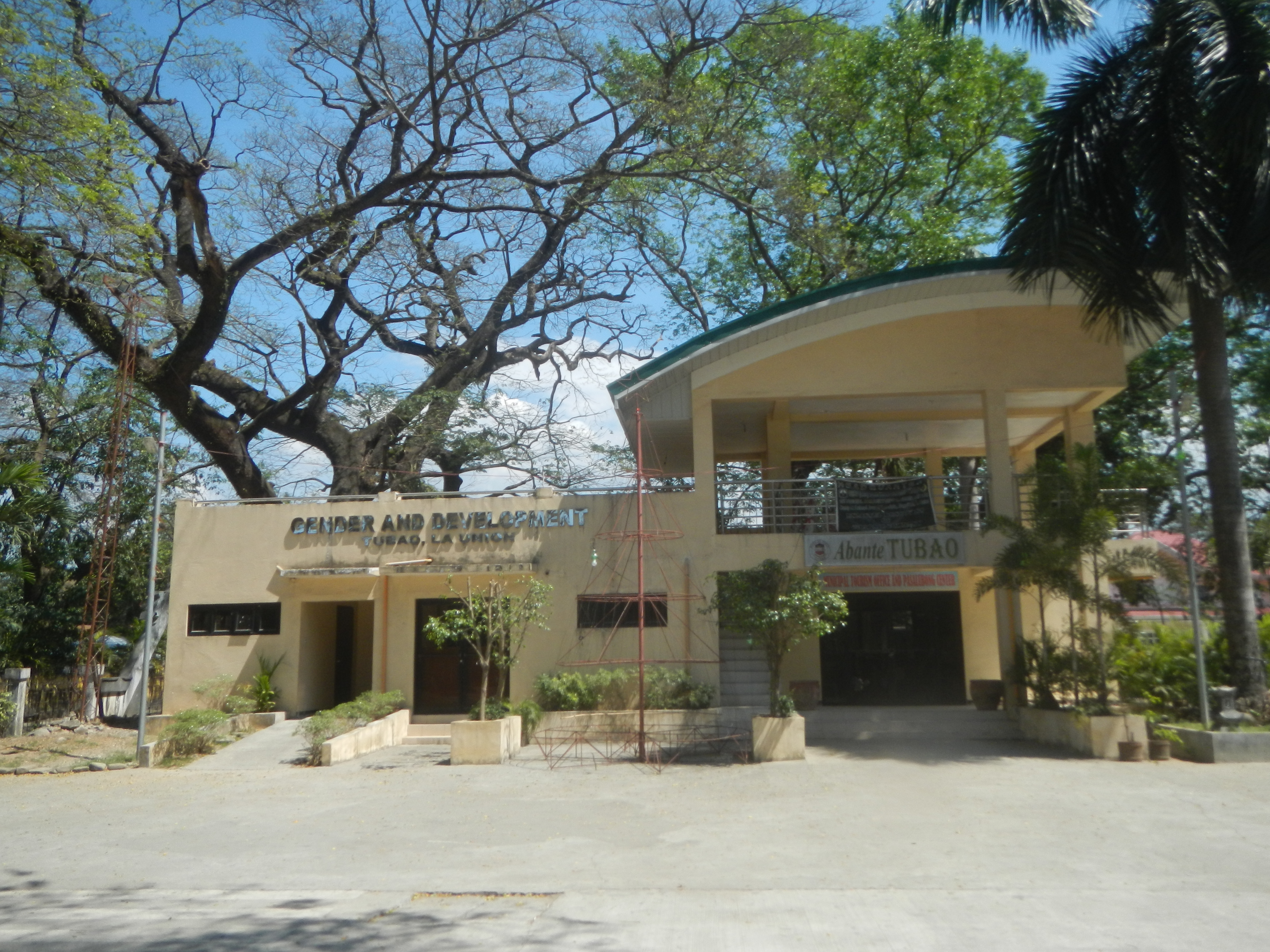
Gender and Development Building

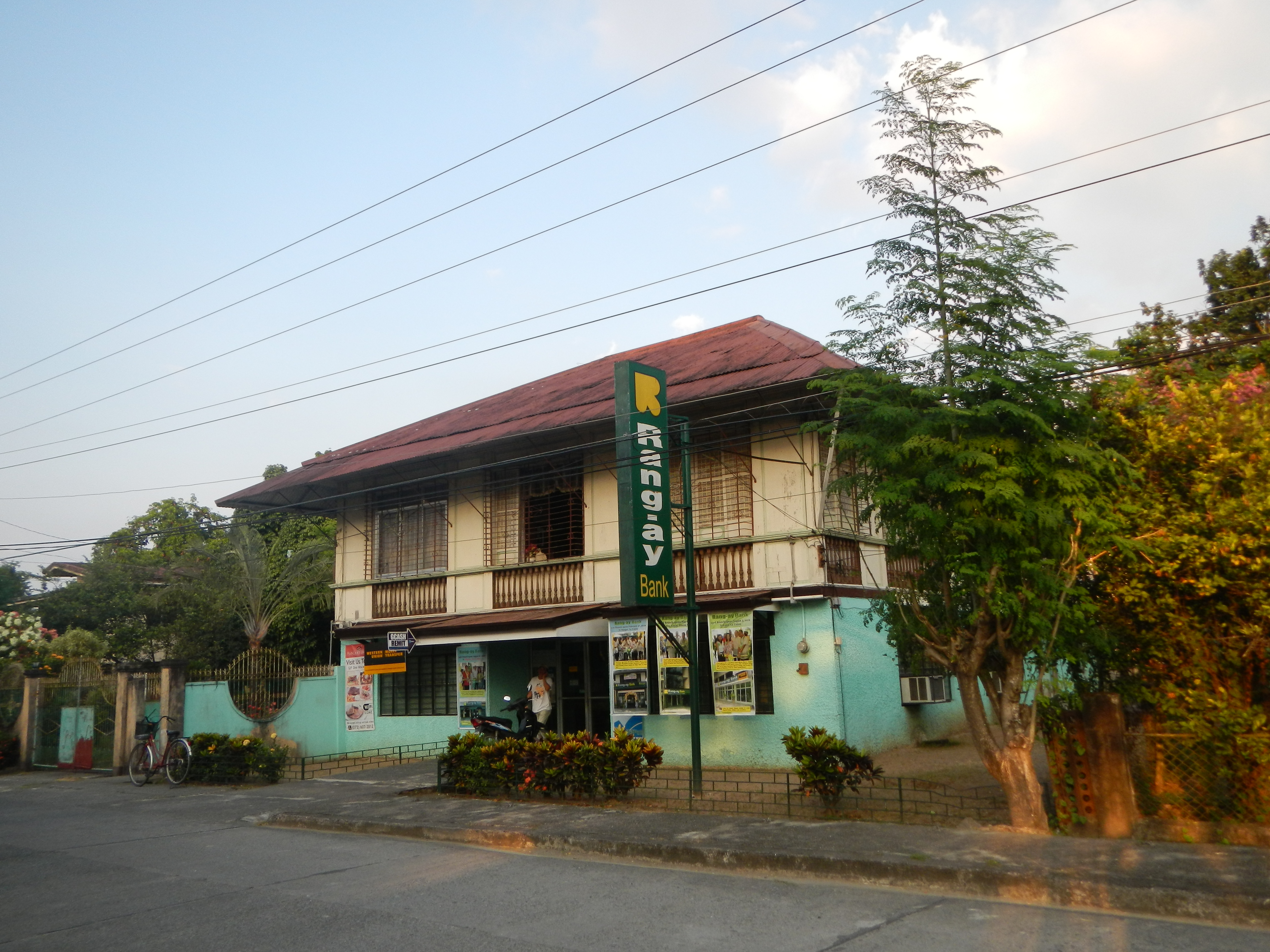
Rang-Ay Bank

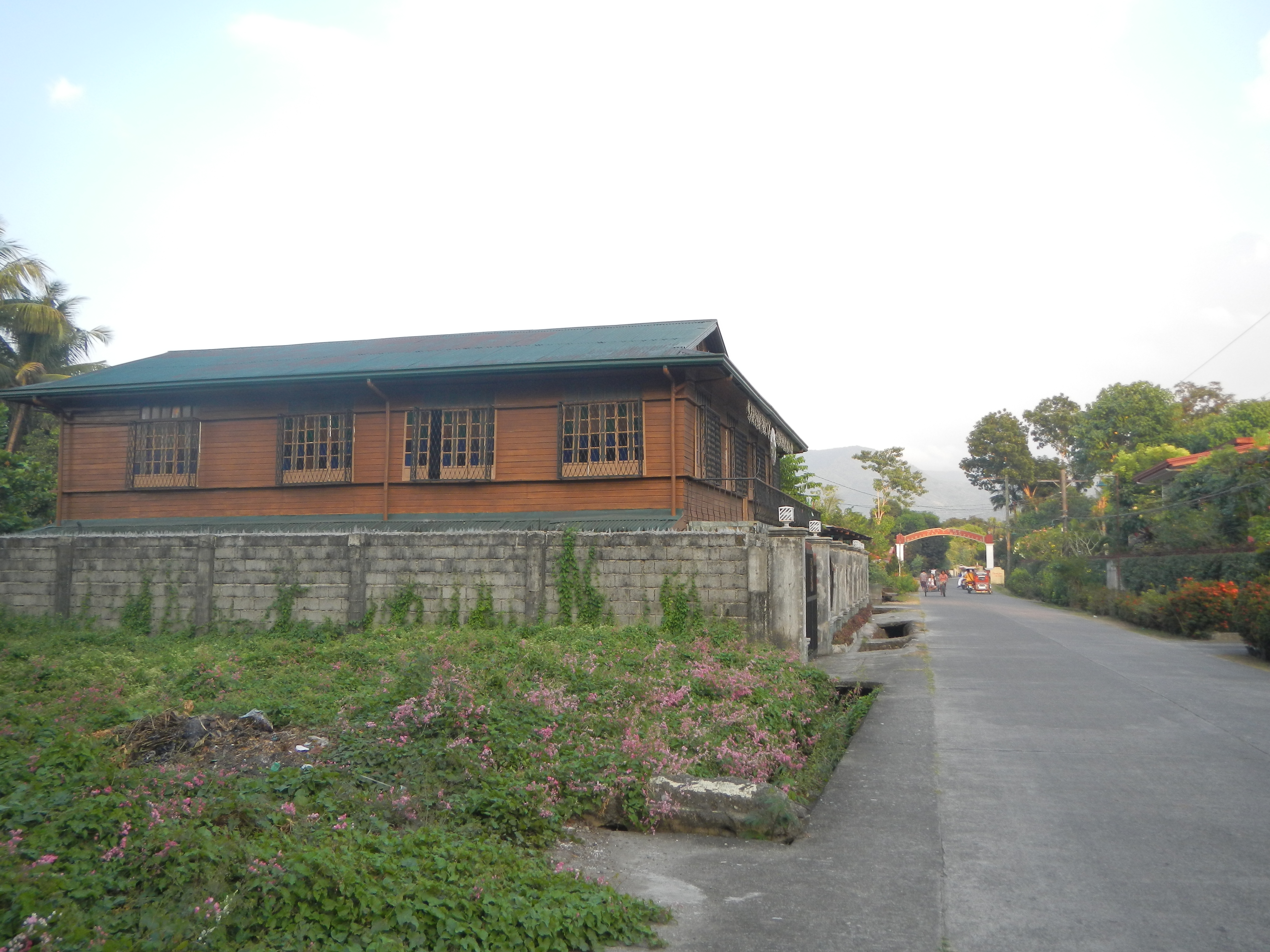
Barangay Gonzalez Welcome Arch

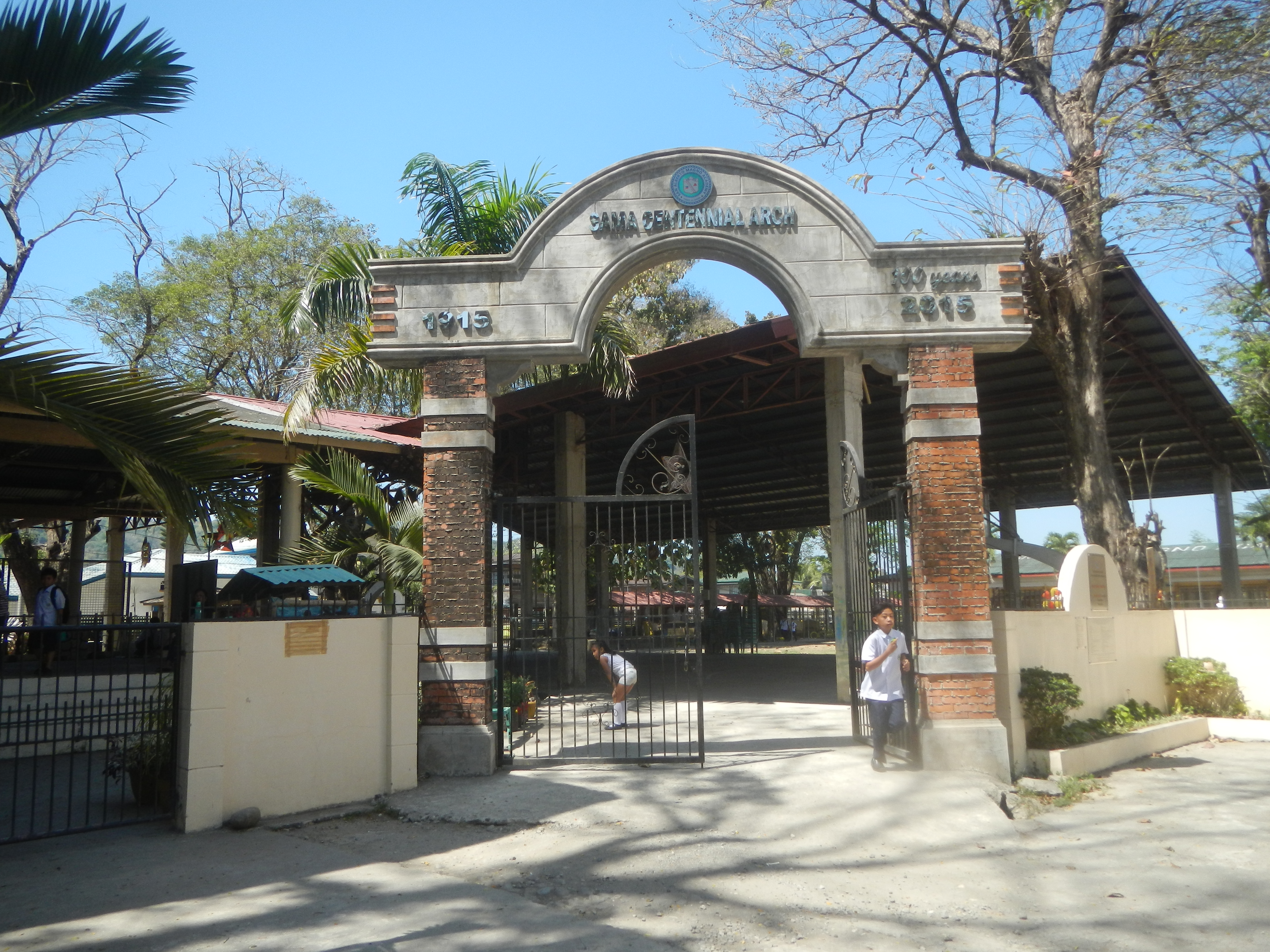
Centennial Arch

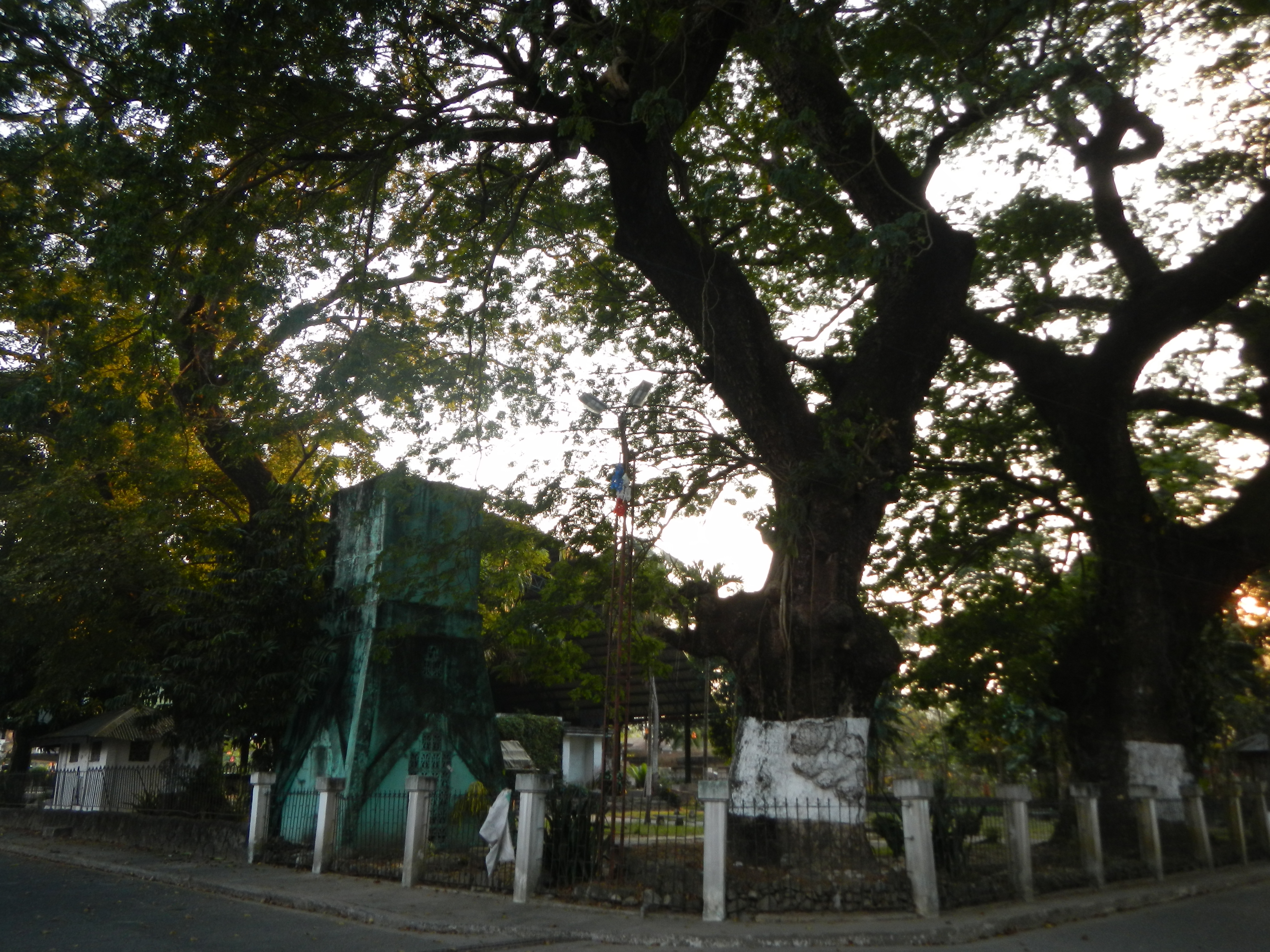
Centuries-old Acacia trees guard the water reservoir in the Plaza

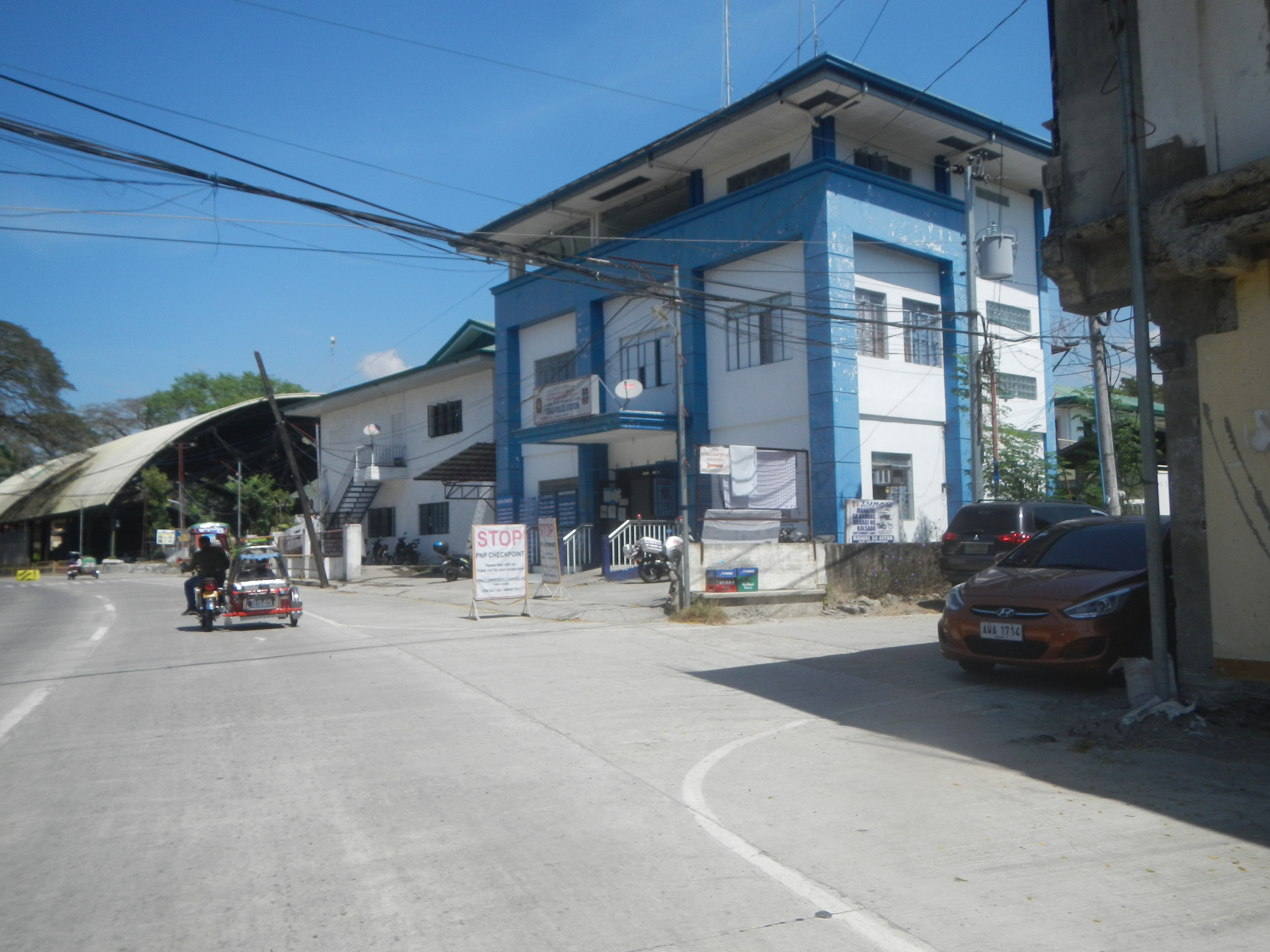
Tubao Police Station

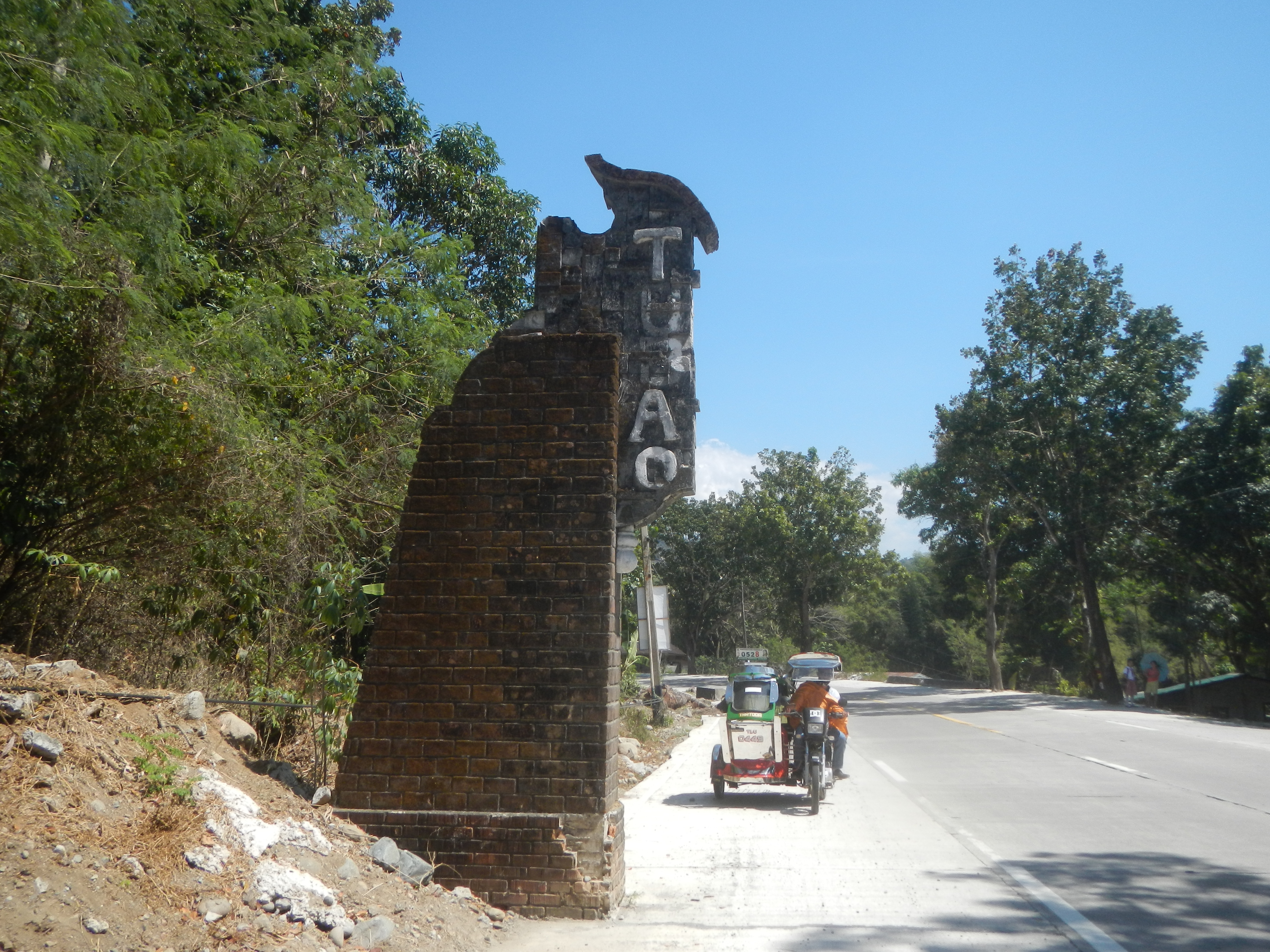
Tubao Welcome Arch

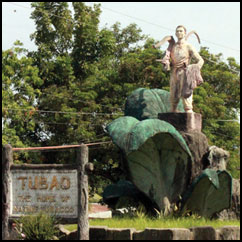
Statue of the Tobacco Farmer, that stood in the Aspiras Highway junction.

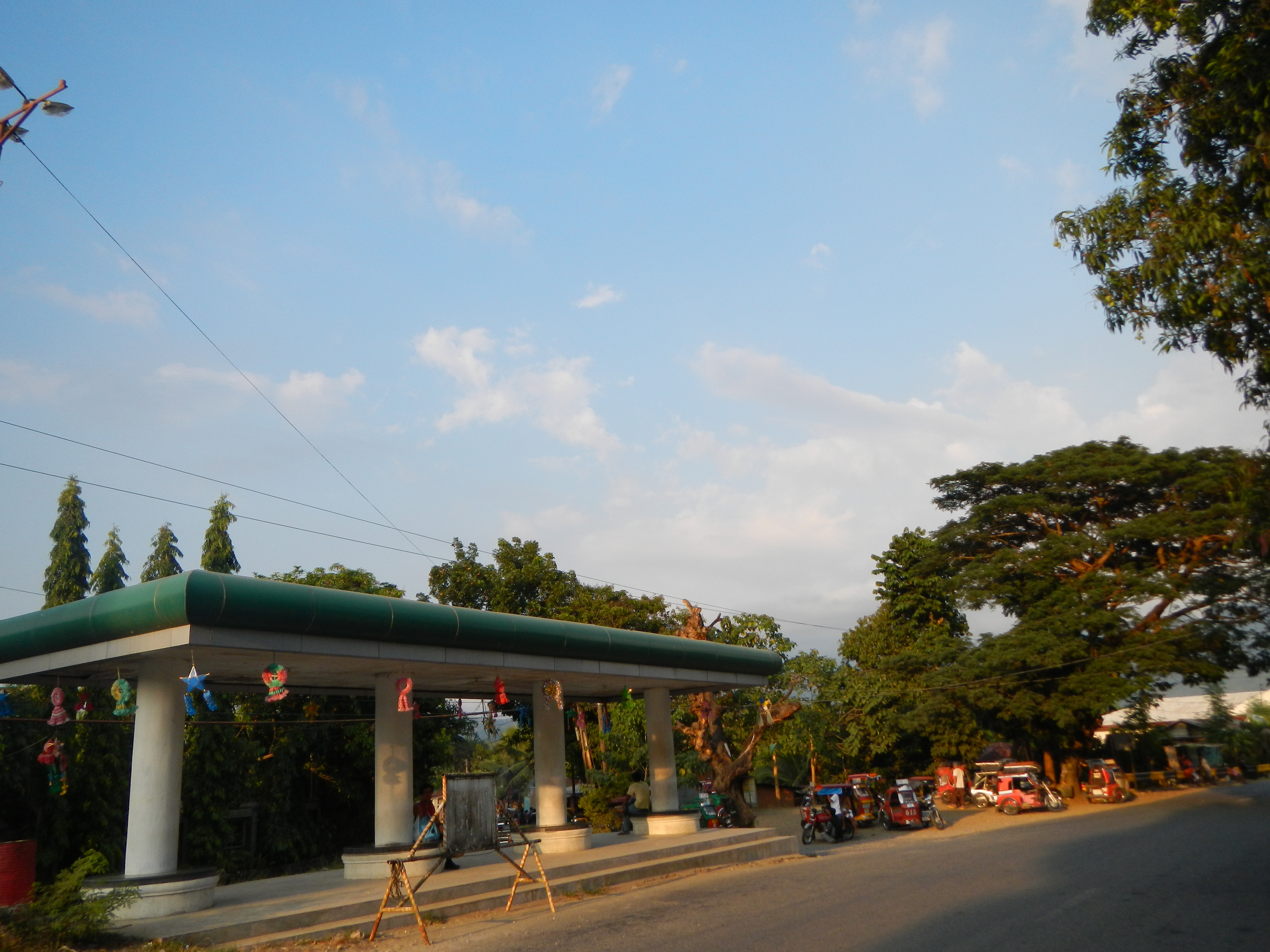
Junction (crossing, Tubao Highway)

San Isidro Labrador de Tubao

== Notable personalities ==
- Bernardo Vergara Former Mayor and Congressman of Baguio
