= Agoo =

Municipality in La Union, Philippines

- Municipality
- Municipality of Agoo
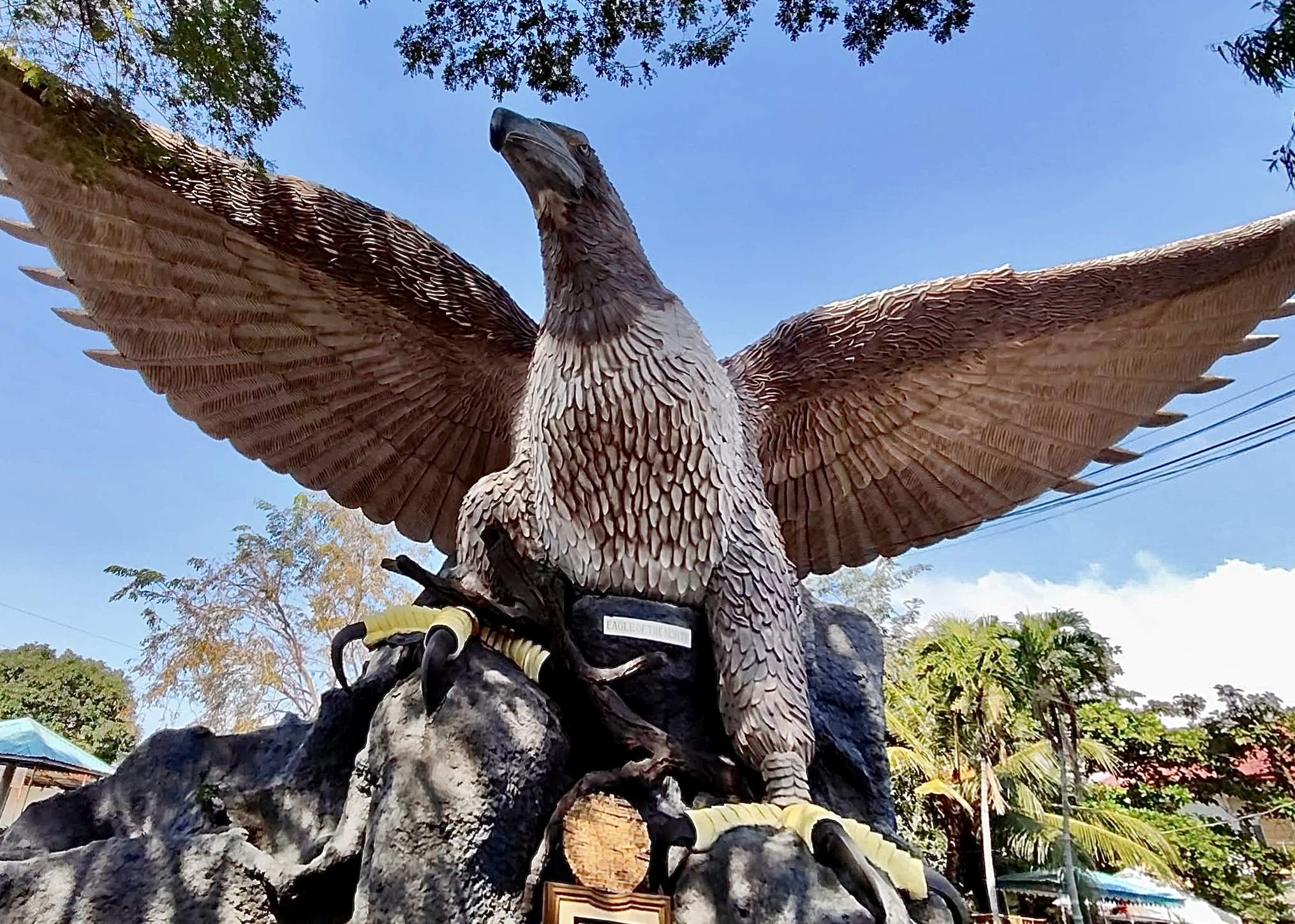
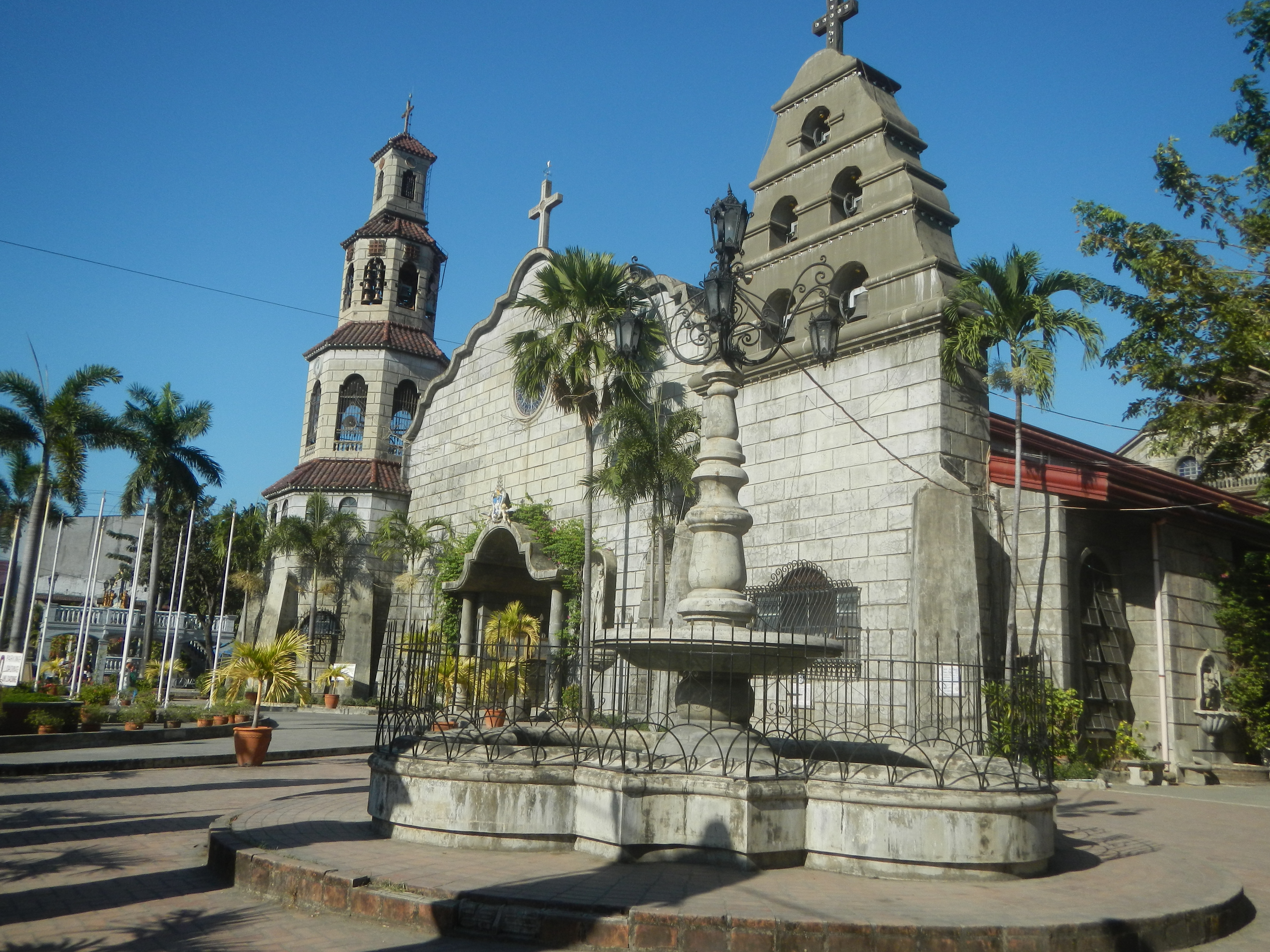
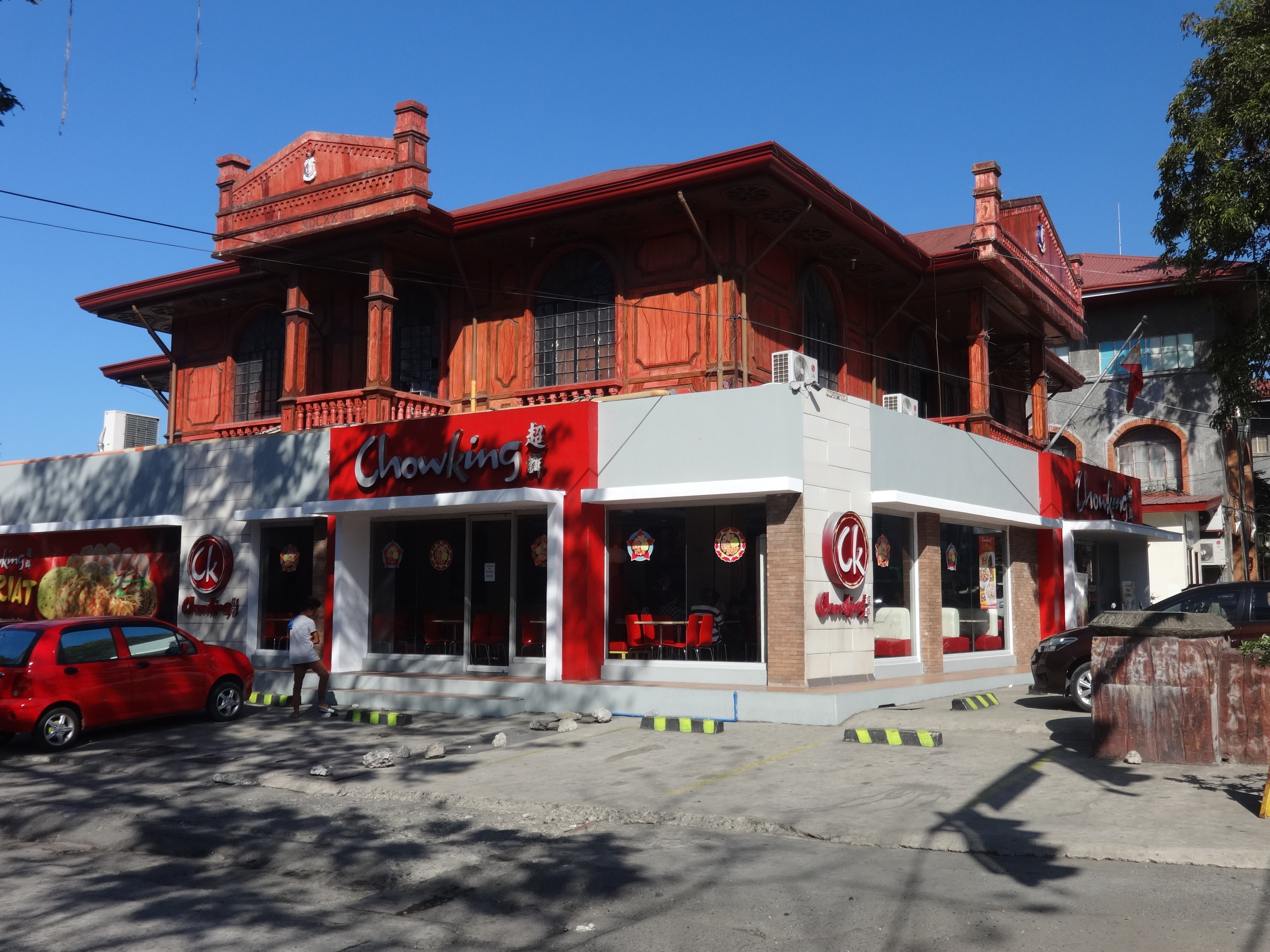
- Eagle of the North, Basilica Minore of Our Lady of Charity and Museo de Iloko

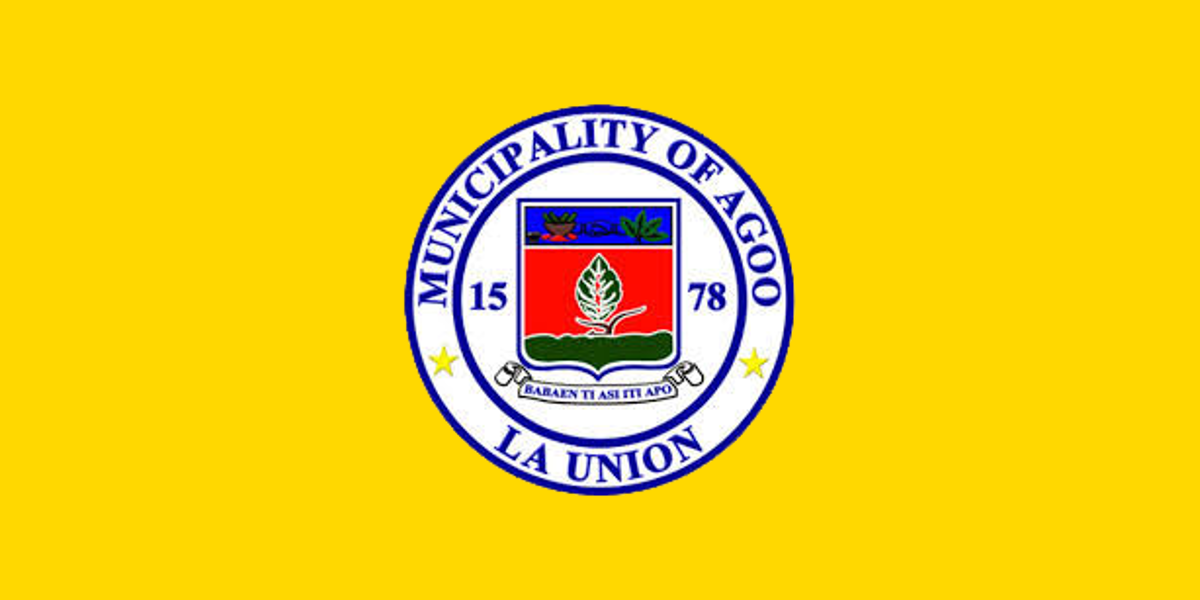
- Flag Seal
- Nickname: Origin of Dinengdeng
- Motto: Agoo Kay Ganda
- Anthem: Agoo Hymn
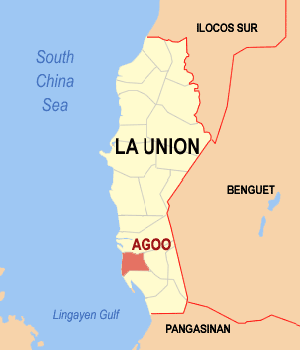
- Map of La Union with Agoo highlighted
- Interactive map of Agoo
- Location within the Philippines
- Coordinates: 16°19′19″N 120°21′53″E
- Country: Philippines
- Region: Ilocos Region
- Province: La Union
- District: 2nd district
- Founded: December 8, 1578
- Barangays: 49 (see Barangays)

Government
  - Type: Sangguniang Bayan
  - Mayor: Frank O. Sibuma
  - Vice Mayor: Antonio A. Eslao
  - Representative: Dante S. Garcia
  - Municipal Council: Members: Mark Anthony Refugia; Precy Komiya; Tonet Quero; Robert Fontanilla; Reynaldo Oller; Jean Boado; Steve Lomboy; Rogelio Garabiles
  - Electorate: 46,655 voters (2025)

Area
  - Total: 52.84 km^{2} (20.40 sq mi)
- Elevation: 38 m (125 ft)
- Highest elevation: 260 m (850 ft)
- Lowest elevation: −1 m (−3.3 ft)

Population (2024 census)
  - Total: 65,256
  - Density: 1,235/km^{2} (3,199/sq mi)
  - Households: 15,953

Economy
  - Income class: 1st municipal income class
  - Poverty incidence: 9.49% (2023)
  - Revenue 2021: ▲PHP 449,680,789.46 million
  - Assets 2021: ▲PHP 1,374,182,114.06 billion
  - Expenditure 2021: ▲PHP 315,552,246.76 million
  - Liabilities 2021: ▼PHP 184,804,460.81 million

Service provider
  - Electricity: La Union Electric Cooperative (LUELCO)
  - Water: Metro Agoo Waterworks Inc. (MAWI)
- Time zone: UTC+8 (PST)
- ZIP code: 2504
- PSGC: 0103301000
- IDD : area code: +63 (0)72
- Native languages: Ilocano; Pangasinan; Tagalog
- Major religions: Roman Catholic
- Notable Festival: Dinengdeng Festival
- Website: agoolaunion.gov.ph

Agoo ([aˈgɔʔo]), officially the Municipality of Agoo (Ilocano: Ili ti Agoo; Pangasinan: Baley na Agoo; Filipino: Bayan ng Agoo), is a coastal municipality in the province of La Union, Philippines. According to the 2024 census, it has a population of 65,256 people.

== Etymology ==
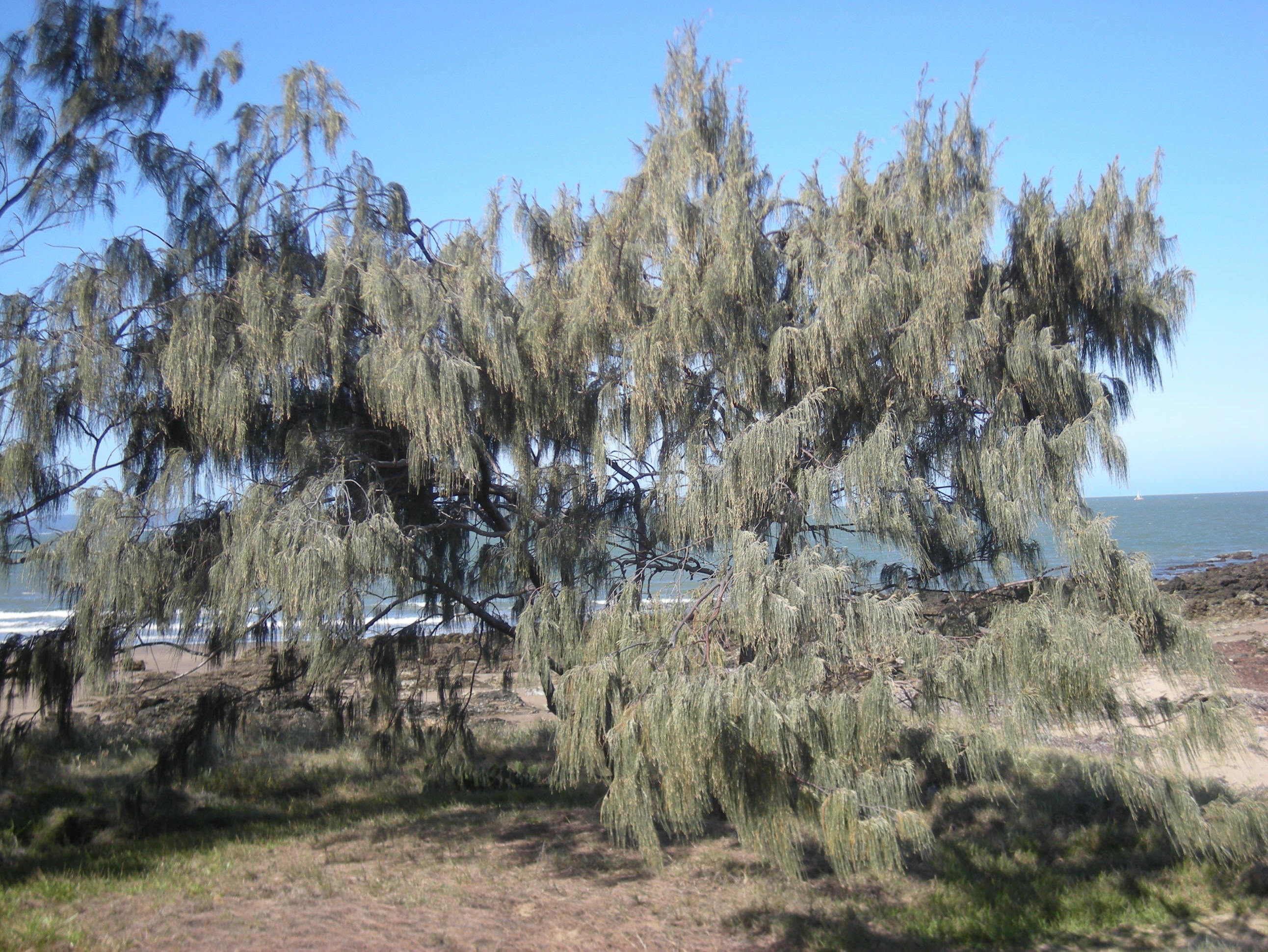
Whistling pine locally known as Aroo or Agoho tree

The name "Agoo" is believed to have originated from a native tree locally known as "aroo" in Ilocano and "agoho" in Tagalog (Casuarina equisetifolia), commonly referred to as the whistling pine. This pine-like evergreen species is known for its slender, needle-like foliage and the distinctive whistling sound produced by the wind passing through its branches. Historically, the tree grew abundantly along the riverbanks and the forested western coastline of Agoo, playing a significant role in the town's natural landscape. Its prevalence in the region is thought to have influenced the naming of the town.

== History ==
Agoo's administration and recorded history reach further back than most Philippine municipalities, with the town being established within the same decade that the Spanish colonizers arrived on the Island of Luzon. The history of the settlement now known as Agoo dates back even further, with both documentary and artifactual evidence supporting the assertion that it was a major port of call for foreign traders before the town was formally founded by the Spaniards.

=== Early history ===
In its early history, Agoo served as a trading port in the northern region of Pre-Hispanic Pangasinan (modern day-Pangasinan and La Union provinces). It was already a coastal maritime trading center for Northwestern Luzon due to its naturally shaped coastline, which provided an excellent harbor for foreign vessels entering Lingayen Gulf. Gold mined from the Cordillera Mountain Range, coming down from the Aringay-Tonglo-Balatok gold trail, was traded in Agoo and in its neighboring settlement, Aringay.

Evidence of trade between Agoo and China has been excavated in the form of porcelain and pottery pieces unearthed at the Catholic church site during its renovation, are now displayed across the street in the Museo de Iloko.

Japanese fishermen eventually established their first settlement in the Philippines in Agoo, passing on their fishing skills and technologies to the local fishermen.

By the time the Spanish arrived to colonize Luzon, they noted that Agoo was already inhabited by people of the "same race as those of Pangasinan". The town was then originally made part of Pangasinan until the Spanish authorities decided to create a new province, La Union, by culling towns from Pangasinan and Ilocos Sur.

=== Spanish Colonial Era ===
==== Sighting by Juan de Salcedo ====
In 1572, Juan de Salcedo, fresh from his conquest of Southern Luzon, was ordered by Miguel Lopez de Legazpi to explore Northern Luzon and "pacify the people in it".

In June 1572, he was traversing the Angalakan River, when he saw and attacked three Japanese ships. When they fled, Salcedo followed them until they landed at a Japanese settlement. After paying tributes, the Japanese were allowed to remain. These Japanese would leave when the port of Agoo was later closed, but not without first teaching the natives their methods of fish culture, rice cultivation, deerskin tanning, duck breeding, and weapons manufacturing.

==== Establishment by the Franciscans ====
A permanent settlement was established in Agoo in 1578 when two Franciscan Missionaries, Fray Juan Bautista Lucarelli of Italy and Fray Sebastian de Baeza of Spain, constructed a thatch and bamboo church in honor of Saint Francis of Assisi. Agoo encompassed a vast land area that spanned the modern-day towns of Rosario, Santo Tomas, Tubao, Pugo, Aringay, Caba, Bauang, and the place called "Atuley" or present-day San Juan. Agoo became the center of the campaign of pacification and conquest, not only of the surrounding towns that would later become La Union but of the mountain tribes in the Cordilleras as well.

The two missionaries formally proclaimed Agoo as a civic unit. naming it after the river along whose banks it was built. At the time, the riverbank was forested with pine-like trees locally called "aroo" or "agoho" (Casuarina equisetifolia, or Whistling Pine).

==== El Puerto de Japon ====
During the early years of the Spanish colonial period, Agoo continued to be an important point of trade with Japan. Miguel De Loarca referred to Agoo as "El Puerto de Japon" - the Japanese Port.

Rosario Mendoza-Cortes, in her book "Pangasinan 1572-1800" notes that Agoo was the region's primary port of call for Japanese and Chinese traders - with the only other contender for the honor being Sual, Pangasinan. This was because there was a Japanese colony there. After all, traders at Agoo would have access to a greater number of people, and it was nearer to China and Japan. The main product traded from the area was the deer pelt, which was shipped to Japan.

Agoo's role as a port deteriorated when the Spanish closed the Philippines to foreign trade. When foreign trade was allowed again, the shape of the gulf had changed and it was thus Sual that became the dominant port.

==== Development by the Augustinians ====
Most of the town's early development can be attributed to the efforts of the Augustinian Order. They took over from the Franciscans and administered the town off and on throughout the Spanish occupation until the secular priests took over in 1898.

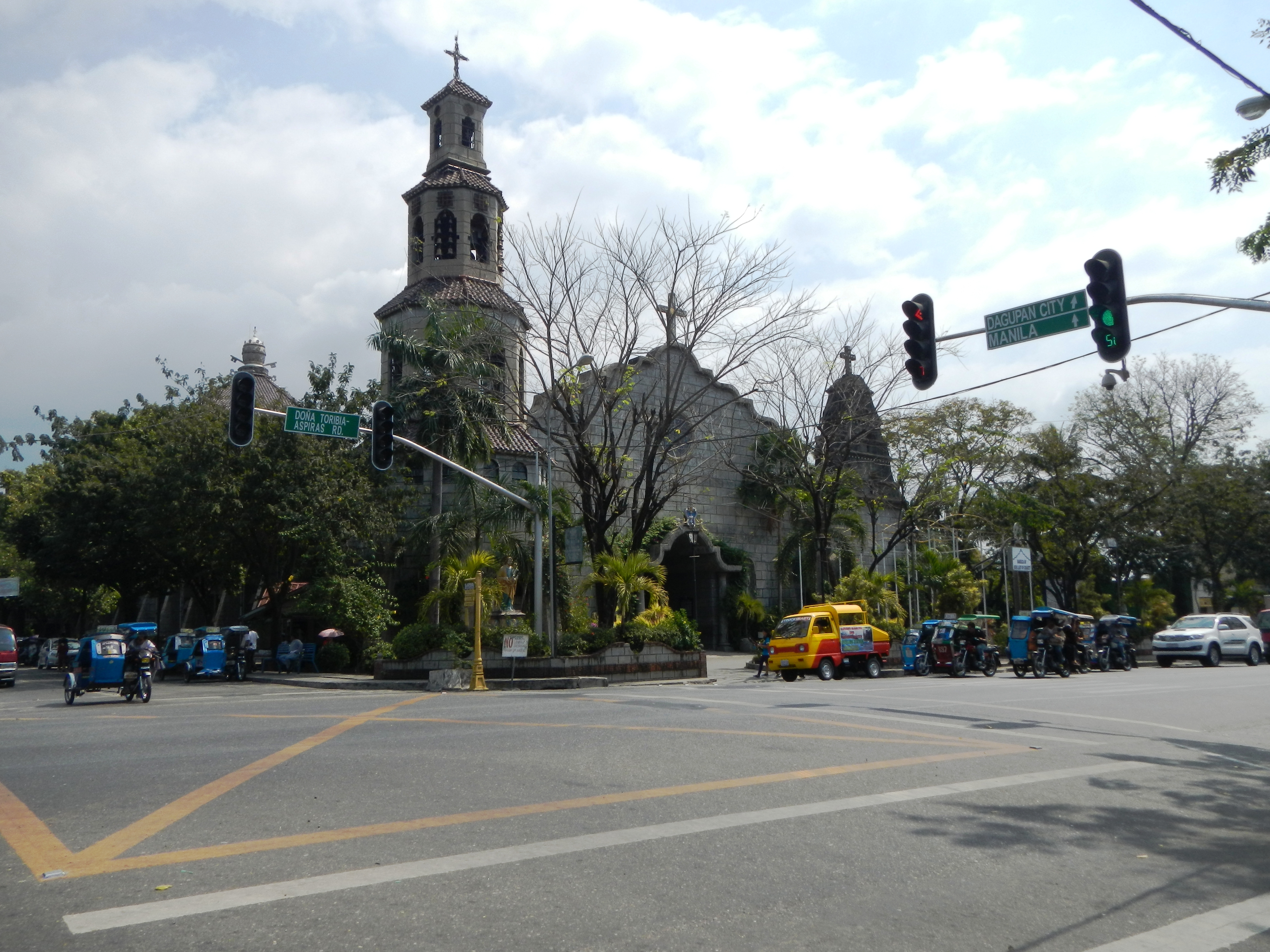
Basilica Minore of Our Lady of Charity

They changed the town's patron saint to Santa Monica. They established a school where reading, writing, industrial works, and catechism were taught. They relocated the town center, laid out the streets and public buildings, and established roads leading to the nearby towns.

To facilitate the construction of churches, public buildings, and bridges, they taught the people brick and lime making, brick-laying, and stone-quarrying. They introduced the "moro-moro", the singing of "pasyon", new farm implement, and new plants.

Father Aquilino Garcia constructed a church, and by the end of the 15th century, the image of Nuestra Señora de Caridad (Our Lady of Charity) was installed in it. This church was destroyed in 1796 and a new one was built when the original settlement was moved to what has ever since been the town center. The church was then claimed to be the largest and grandest in northern Luzon during that time. Ruins are scattered throughout the town's center and some are visible at this point.

==== Battle of Agoo (1661) ====
In 1661, Andres Malong of Pangasinan failed to recover La Union from the Spaniards after the Battle of Agoo.

==== 1849 Integration into La Union ====
On October 29, 1849, Governor General Claveria issued a promovido to fuse the Pangasinan-Ilocos-Cordillera areas into La Union. On March 2, 1850, Governor General Antonio Maria Blanco signed the Superior Decreto of La Union (34th province from Cebu-1565), with Captain Toribio Ruiz de la Escalera as the first Gobernador Military y Politico. Isabella II of Spain decreed the province's creation on April 18, 1854.

The new province comprised the north-western towns of Pangasinan and the towns of Ilocos Sur south of the Amburayan river. Agoo was the oldest town to be integrated and was listed as having a population of 6,936 people.

==== Philippine Revolution ====
During the Philippine Revolution, numerous residents of Agoo actively took part in the fight for independence from Spanish rule. Led by General Manuel Tinio y Bondoc, a close ally of Emilio Aguinaldo, the local population engaged in battles against Spanish forces in Northern Luzon.

=== American colonial era ===
Philippine independence from Spain was short-lived, as the Philippine-American War soon followed. In 1899, the town of Agoo became a focal point of resistance against American troops. Guerrilla Unit No. 5, commanded by Captain Fontanilla, operated across Agoo and nearby areas such as Aringay, Tubao, Santo Tomas, and Rosario. These guerrilla forces employed tactics such as ambushes, sabotage, and coordinated attacks on American supply lines to disrupt enemy operations. Their resilience and knowledge of the terrain made them formidable opponents.

On November 20, 1899, American forces reached La Union. The guerrilla forces mounted a well-planned defense, causing heavy casualties among the U.S. troops. This battle demonstrated the determination of local forces to resist foreign domination, despite the overwhelming resources of the American military. However, the loss of key leaders and the superior firepower of the Americans eventually led to the decline of organized resistance in the region.

By 1901, La Union, including Agoo came under full American control. The U.S. military government implemented strategies to suppress any remaining resistance, including strict curfews, intelligence-gathering operations, and the establishment of garrisons.

During the 1910s, the American colonial administration began introducing several public services that would reshape the region. A public education system was established, with American teachers known as Thomasites arriving to teach English and promote American cultural values. This system significantly influenced the educational framework of La Union, providing new opportunities for learning but also introducing colonial ideologies. Public hospitals were also built, improving access to healthcare for residents, while infrastructure development, such as roads and bridges, facilitated economic growth.

Additionally, the introduction of a local governance system allowed Filipinos to participate in elections, marking the first steps toward self-governance. These developments brought notable changes to Agoo's social, educational, and political environment, shaping the town's transition into the modern era under American occupation.

=== World War II ===
Agoo, along with the towns of Caba, La Union and Bauang, La Union were the first places the Japanese invasion force sought to control during the main effort to capture Luzon at the beginning of World War 2 - now known as the Japanese Invasion of Lingayen Gulf. Capturing the three towns which were connected by a high quality road, but protected on one side by the ocean and the other by the sea, meant that the Japanese forces were easily able to establish a secure beachhead. Once they had done so, they launched attacks against defense forces at San Fernando, La Union and Rosario, La Union, and from there they deployed southwards across the plains of Pangasinan and Tarlac to take Fort Stotsenburg in Pampanga, then Bulacan, and finally Manila.

In the early morning of 22 December 1941, Agoo was one of three beachheads taken by the invasion force of General Masaharu Homma during the Japanese Invasion of Lingayen Gulf.

The Japanese' 47th Infantry Regiment under the command of Col Isamu Yanagi, accompanied by the 4th Tank Regiment and supported by a flotilla of the Imperial Japanese Navy led by Vice Admiral Kenzaburo Hara (consisting of the light cruiser Natori , destroyers Fumizuki, Nagatsuki, Satsuki, Minazuki, Harukaze, Hatakaze, three minesweepers, six anti-submarine craft and six transports) was supposed to land on the beaches of Agoo beginning 5:00 A.M. on December 22, 1941, having left Takao on Taiwan the evening of December 18.

The Japanese 47th Infantry and 4th Tank Regiment were confronted by heavy weather, however, and were thus delayed and dispersed. They landed at about 7:30 A.M. on a four-mile stretch of beach all the way from Agoo to just north of Damortis.

Agoo is thus recorded in World War II annals as one of the Japanese staging points for the Battle of Rosario.

=== Martial law ===
The beginning of the 1970s marked a period of turmoil and change in the Philippines because Ferdinand Marcos had used foreign debt to fund too many public works projects just before his 1969 reelection campaign, which led to the 1969 Philippine economic crisis and the First Quarter Storm protests. La Union residents mostly did not speak up about the economic stresses they were experiencing, but when Marcos declared martial law in 1972, Agoo was included with the rest of the country.

Marcos' efforts to consolidate political power did not get much resistance in the La Union, including Agoo, since Marcos' use of violent methods for stifling dissent thus mostly took place in other provinces, such as nearby Abra, Kalinga, and Mountain Province. Marcos also had strong political ties to La Union, notably Jose D. Aspiras whom he appointed as Tourism Minister. He also allowed the powerful family factions (which had dominated La Union politics since before the American colonial era) to stay in place.

But there were some Agoo natives, such as then-Davao Archbishop Antonio L. Mabutas, who spoke against the human rights abuses during martial law. Since Bishop Mabutas was in Davao at the time, he was aware of human rights abuses in that city, particularly the torture and killings of church workers. The pastoral letter he wrote against Martial law, "Reign of Terror in the Countryside," is notable for having been the first pastoral to be written against Marcos' martial law administration, and even doubly so because Mabutas was considered a conservative within the Catholic church hierarchy in the Philippines.

=== 1980s and 1990s ===
==== Establishment of High School and University ====
On July 23, 1945, the Municipal government, then led by Mayor Miguel Fontanilla, established South Provincial High School in response to education-oriented citizen Ramon Mabutas' calls for the establishment of a public high school. South Provincial High School turned Agoo into a center of education for Southern La Union and became one of the constituent state-run schools that were combined by Presidential Decree 1778 to create the Don Mariano Marcos Memorial State University in 1981.

==== After the 1986 EDSA Revolution ====
After the February 1986 People Power Revolution, President Corazon Aquino placed the Philippines under a revolutionary government until the 1987 Constitution of the Philippines could be ratified. During this time, the Municipality of Agoo was placed under the administration of OIC Mayor Antonio Q. Estrada.

==== 1990 Luzon earthquake ====
At 4.26 P.M. on July 16, 1990, Agoo was hit by the 1990 Luzon earthquake, and was one of the most severely affected locales.

The Basilica Minore of Our Lady of Charity was badly damaged, and the bell tower which was then the only remaining structure from the 1893 church, crashed completely. The Agoo municipal building collapsed completely, killing numerous citizens who were inside because they were in line to pay in time for the national income tax deadline for that quarter. Numerous tombs in the municipal cemetery were fractured open.

==== Alleged Marian apparitions ====
The town gained media attention in the early 1990s for the alleged Marian apparitions of the Blessed Virgin Mary to Judiel Nieva. Nieva reported seeing the Virgin Mary, popularly known as Our Lady of Agoo atop a Guava tree, a statue weeping with blood became highly sensationalized. Religious pilgrimages among Filipino Catholics increased by the millions as people flocked to see the phenomenon. The alleged apparition and healing events came into the attention of the Catholic Bishops' Conference of the Philippines, who in turn began an investigation and later released an ecclesiastical ruling that the apparitions were non-supernatural in origin in 1993.

=== Early 21st century ===
==== Failed proposed merger of Agoo and Aringay ====
On June 11, 2014, then-representative Eufranio Eriguel, alongside co-authors La Union first district Rep. Victor Ortega and Abono party-list Rep. Francisco Emmanuel Ortega III, filed House Bill 4644 to establish the first city in the second district by merging the municipalities of Agoo and Aringay. The proposed city would have two districts under a city mayor and city vice mayor along with 14 councilors in the Sangguniang Panlungsod, new positions for which the former municipal officials could run despite having the terms limits of their offices.

The proposed bill sparked protests from the people of both Agoo and Aringay who did not want the merger because it would subject them to the same high local taxes as Agoo and because of concerns that Agoo and Aringay would lose their cultural identities. The proposed merger did not push through within term of the 16th Congress.

==== Elections and drug-related violence (2010-2018) ====
Since 2010, Agoo has been regularly declared an election hotspot due to incidences of violence during national and local election periods. Major incidents include the murder of former Tubao Vice Mayor Lazaro Gayo outside his law office near Agoo's Municipal Hall in October 2012, and an assassination attempt on Tubao Mayor Dante Garcia in the same year; Congressman Eufranio Eriguel survived a bombing in April 2016 which allegedly had him as a target.

The violence was attributed to "intense rivalry" between incumbent Congressman Eufranio Eriguel and his 2010 opposing candidate, former Rep. Thomas Dumpit Jr., and later to clashes between the followers of Congressman Eriguel and his 2013 opponent, former Army General Mario Chan.

In 2013, the declaration of the towns of Tubao, Agoo, Caba, and Aringay as election hotspots compelled the Philippine National Police to temporarily remove the police chiefs of the four towns during the election period, a decision which was protested by incumbent politicians in both towns, including then-Congressman Eriguel and his wife, then-Mayor Sandra Eriguel. A few years later in 2017, a number of drug-related incidents in Agoo came to national attention. This resulted in the sacking of the police chief of Agoo, along with those of the Southern La Union towns of Bauang, Naguilan, and Tubao.

On August 16, 2016, former Congressman Eriguel was included by Philippine President Rodrigo Duterte as one of the local government officials and legislators allegedly involved in illegal drug trade in his "I am sorry for my country" speech. Eriguel and a number of other southern La Union politicians denied these allegations.

On the evening of May 12, 2018, Eriguel was gunned down along with two of his bodyguards and one of his supporters by nine assailants in Barangay Capas after delivering a speech during a Sangguniang Kabataan meeting for the 2018 barangay elections. A 67-year-old candidate for Capas barangay captain was thus arrested hours later as a suspect in the assassination, while Eriguel's wife, Rep. Sandra Eriguel, and their daughter, Mayor Stefanie Ann Eriguel, were provided with a security detail.

==== COVID-19 pandemic in Agoo (2020 - 2023) ====
Along with the rest of the Philippines, Agoo was affected by the COVID-19 pandemic when it struck the Philippines in early 2020. Agoo was included in the lengthy Enhanced community quarantine in Luzon, and the municipality occasionally had to reimpose mask mandates once new spikes of the disease were reported, in order to prevent larger outbreaks.

==== Reforestation efforts and establishment of Ecopark (2021-present) ====
In 2021, the Philippines' Department of Environment and Natural Resources (DENR) established the Agoo Eco-Park in a 10,774.68 hectare area (of which 3% is land in Barangay Sta Rita West, while the rest is part of the marine ecosystem) has already been designated as a Protected Landscape and Seascape as part of the Agoo–Damortis Protected Landscape and Seascape (ADLPS) in 2018, and 2021 marked the beginning of systematic reforestation efforts under the national greening program (NGP) which the national government first launched in 2011.

A 2023 vegetation survey of the land area alone found thriving populations of 17 plants, or which 7 were native and 4 were naturalized while only 6 were exotic, cultivated or unclassified. Philippine Native trees found in the survey included the Mangrove pagatpat (Sonneratia alba), Ayangile (Acacia confusa), Aroo (Casuarina equisetifolia), Talisay (Terminalia catappa L.) and Bakawan lalaki (Rhizophora apiculata) and native undergrowth species included Bagaswa (Ipomoea pes-caprae L.), Kawad-kawaran (Cynodon dactylon) and Putok-putok (Ruellia tuberosa). Of these, the Mangrove pagatpat was the single most common species, and was identified as one of three species "likely to influence the growth and survival of other species" - the other two being the Ayangile, and the Aroo tree after which the town of Agoo is named.

==== Election of Mayor Sibuma ====
After local tensions leading up to the 2022 Philippine local elections, Frank Ong Sibuma was elected as the municipal mayor of Agoo. Sibuma's candidacy was questioned on technicalities regarding his residency, and a long dispute had to be resolved by the Supreme Court of the Philippines in a January 24, 2023 decision which upheld Sibuma's election.

== Geography ==
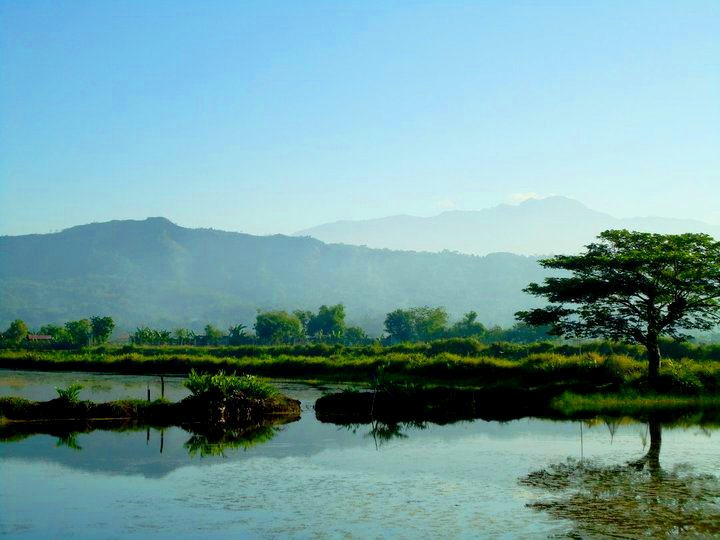
Landscape in San Roque West at Sitio Banaoang

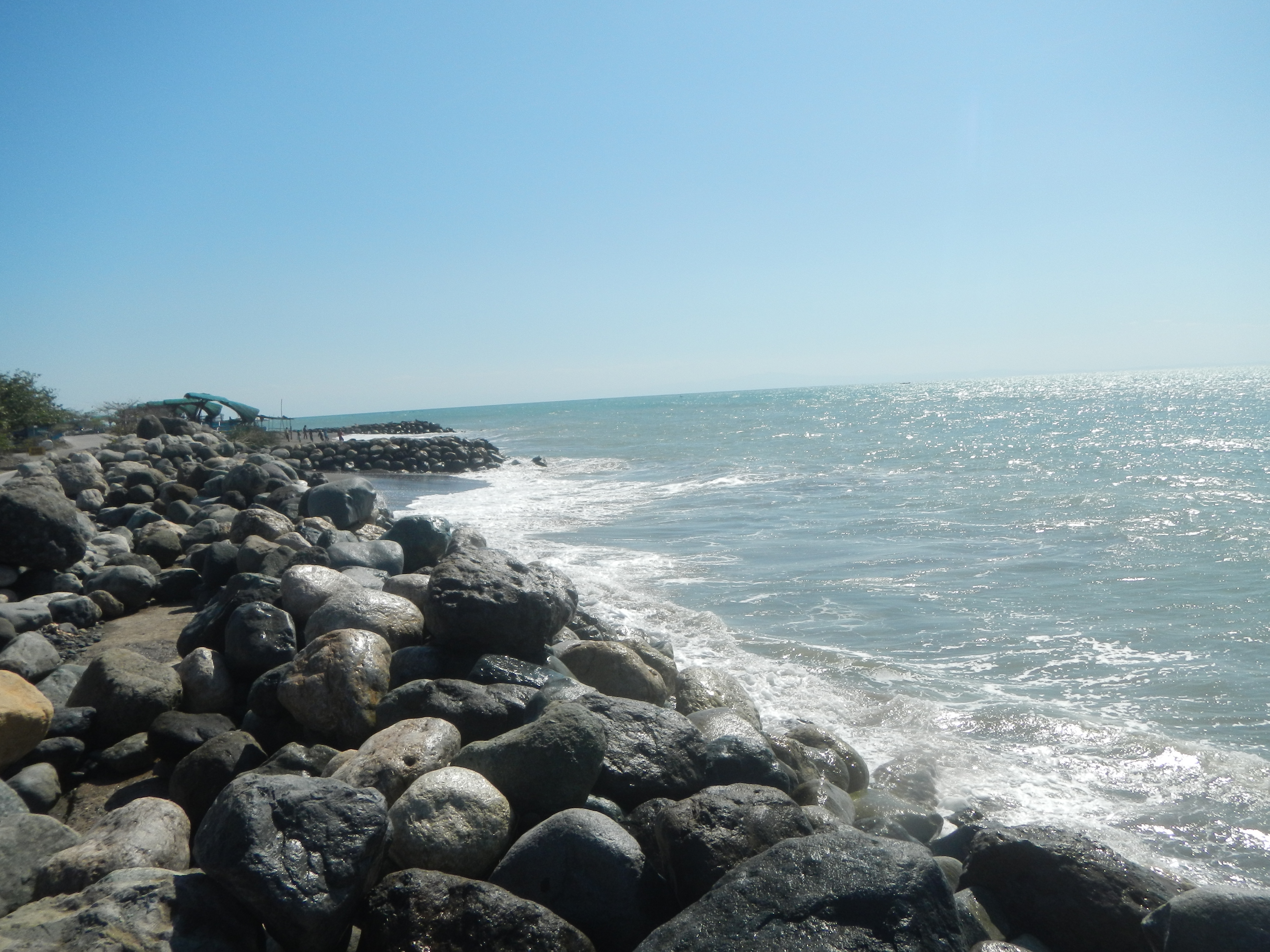
Agoo Beach

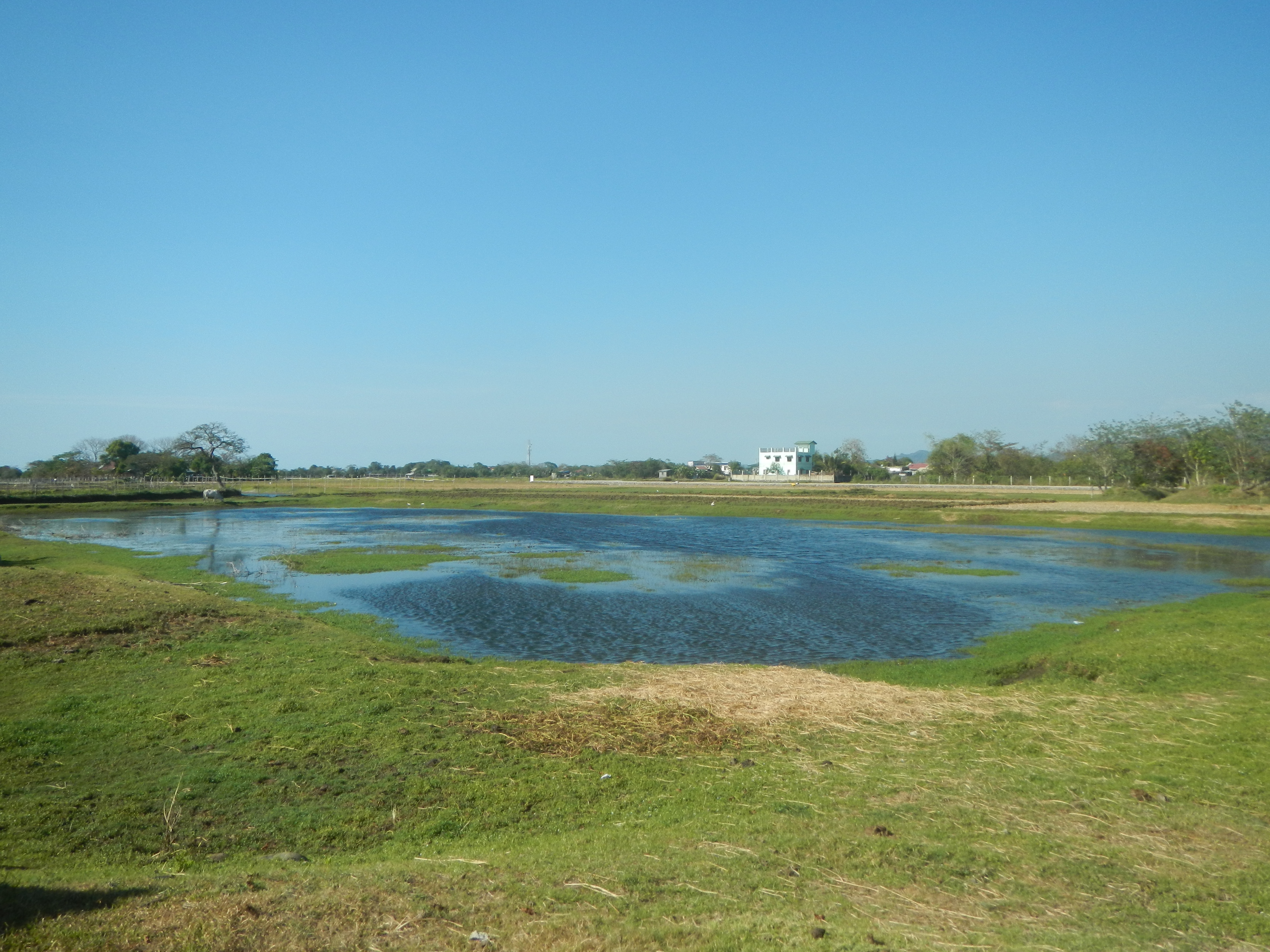
Wetland in San Nicolas

Situated 34.16 kilometres (21.23 mi) from the provincial capital San Fernando, and 232.97 kilometres (144.76 mi) from the country's capital city of Manila, Agoo is a coastal municipality located on a narrow plain between the foothills of the Cordillera Central and the Lingayen Gulf, also known as the South China Sea. It has a land area of 52.84 square kilometers or 20.40 square miles, which constitutes 3.52% of La Union's total area. Agoo is one of the southern municipalities of the province and is bordered on the north by Aringay, on the east by Tubao, which lies further up the foothills of the Cordilleras, and on the south by Sto. Tomas. The western shores of Agoo consist of a long beach facing the Lingayen Gulf and the South China Sea.

=== Topography ===
The town's topography is characterized by hilly and mountainous terrain that rises gradually eastward from the coastal plains. Its landscape is also marked by wetlands, scrublands, and grasslands. Mount Katayagan, the highest peak in the town, provides a watershed that supplies water for irrigation and households, and is home to biodiversity, including a closed forest with secondary-growth tropical moist deciduous forest.

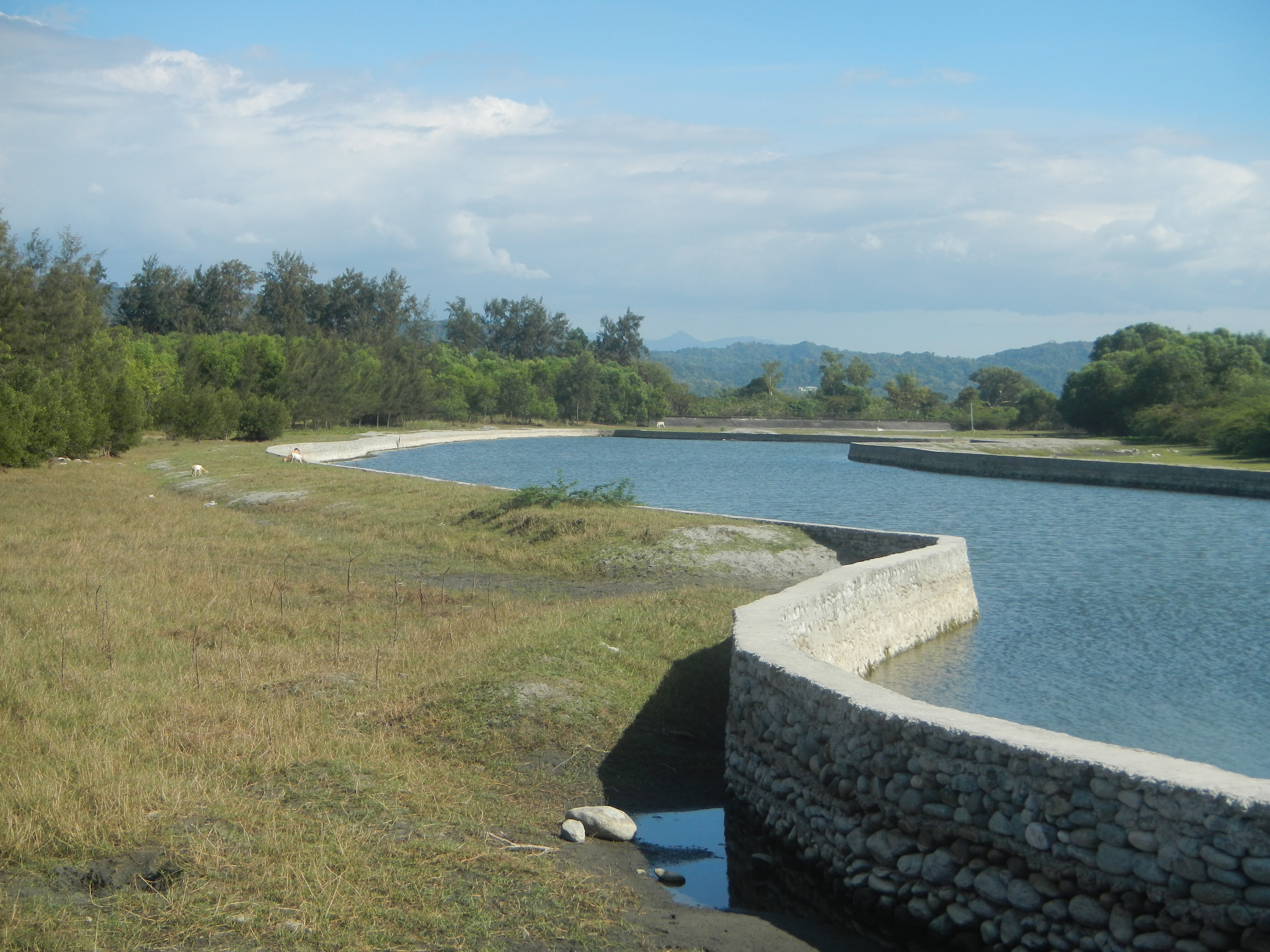
Agoo River in Santa Rita

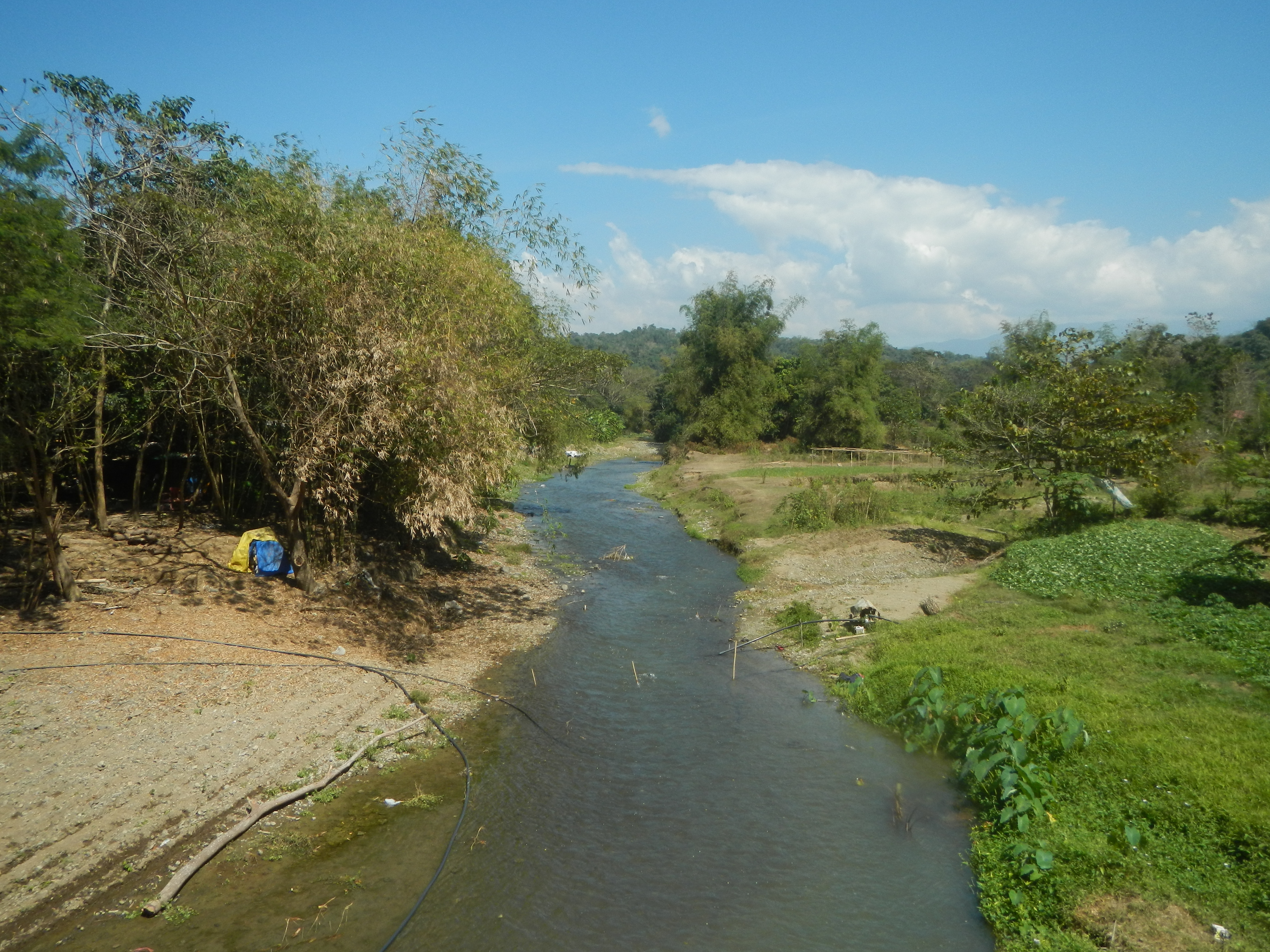
Creek in Ambiticay

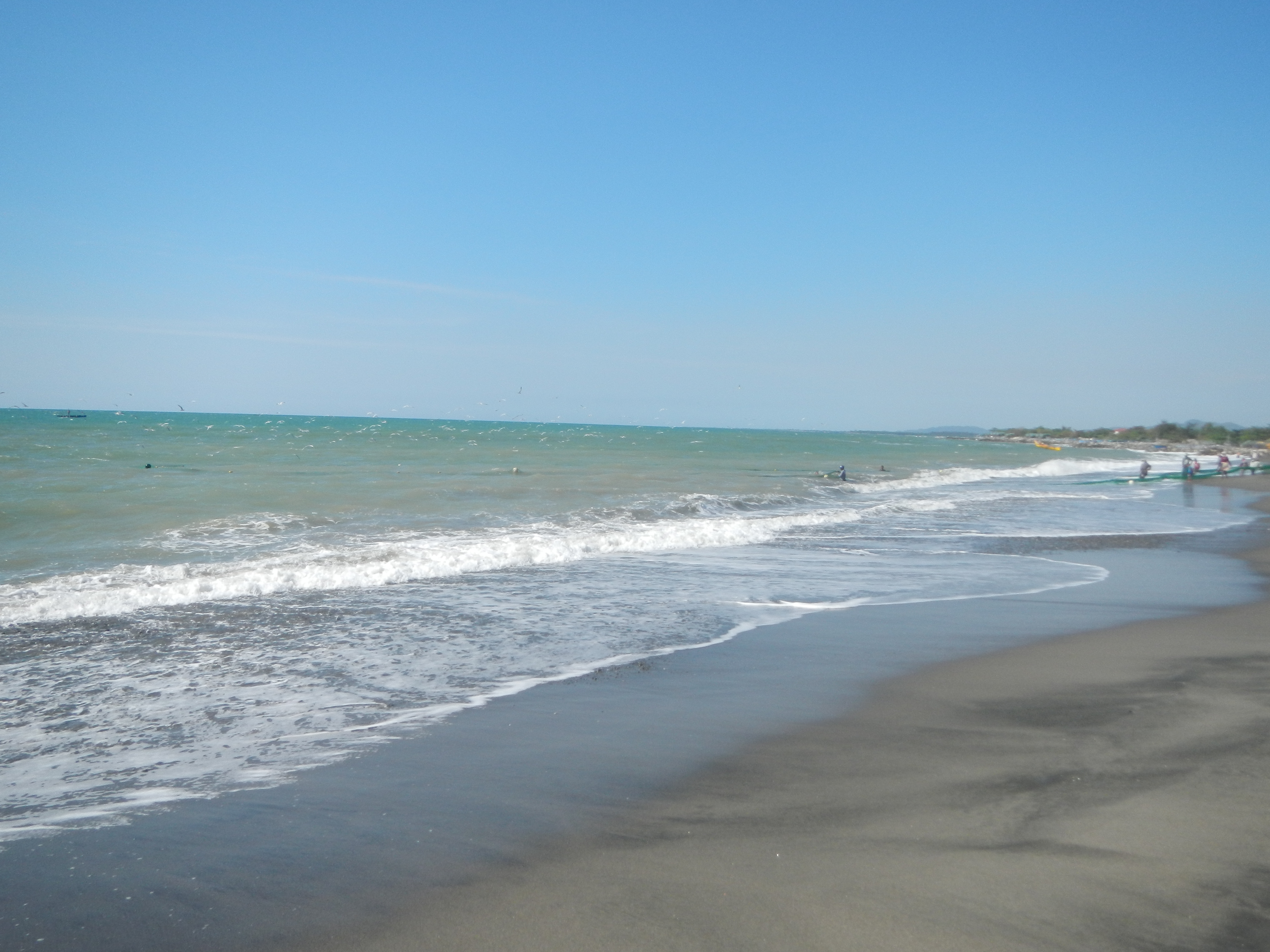
Coastal area in San Isidro

=== Hydrology ===
Several creeks and rivers flow through the municipality, including the Agoo River. This river, sometimes referred to by locals as the Principe River, in reference to the Taytay Principe Bridge (which literally means "the prince's bridge), which crosses it along the main highway. The Agoo River flows from the uplands in the east to its mouth at the South China Sea in the west.

=== Soil types ===
According to the findings of the Philippine Rice Research Institute, Agoo's land is composed of several types of soil, categorized as "San Manuel," "Maligaya," "Bauang," and "Annam." The San Manuel soil is a dark grayish-brown sandy loam with medium compactness and a pH ranging from highly acidic to slightly alkaline. The Maligaya soil is a dark grayish-brown clay loam with coarse fragments of soft, powdery red and black concretions, characterized by medium compactness and a neutral to slightly alkaline pH. The Bauang soil is a dark grayish-brown clay loam with coarse fragments of highly weathered stratified shales and sandstones, with a pH ranging from strongly acidic to slightly acidic. The Annam soil is a brown clay loam with coarse fragments of partially and highly weathered rock or gravel, along with yellowish-brown iron and magnesium concretions, characterized by an extremely acidic to slightly acidic pH.

=== Barangays ===
Agoo is divided into 49 barangays. Each barangay consists of puroks and some have sitios.

- Ambitacay
- Balawarte
- Capas
- Consolacion (Poblacion)
- Macalva Central
- Macalva Norte
- Macalva Sur
- Nazareno
- Purok
- San Agustin East
- San Agustin Norte
- San Agustin Sur
- San Antonino
- San Antonio
- San Francisco
- San Isidro
- San Joaquin Norte
- San Joaquin Sur
- San Jose Norte
- San Jose Sur
- San Juan
- San Julian Central
- San Julian East
- San Julian Norte
- San Julian West
- San Manuel Norte
- San Manuel Sur
- San Marcos
- San Miguel
- San Nicolas Central (Poblacion)
- San Nicolas East
- San Nicolas Norte (Poblacion)
- San Nicolas Sur (Poblacion)
- San Nicolas West
- San Pedro
- San Roque East
- San Roque West
- San Vicente Norte
- San Vicente Sur
- Santa Ana
- Santa Barbara (Poblacion)
- Santa Fe
- Santa Maria
- Santa Monica
- Santa Rita (Nalinac)
- Santa Rita East
- Santa Rita Norte
- Santa Rita Sur
- Santa Rita West

=== Climate ===
The town experiences the prevailing monsoon climate of Northern Luzon, characterized by a dry season from November to April and a wet season from May to October.

Climate data for Agoo, La Union
Month	Jan	Feb	Mar	Apr	May	Jun	Jul	Aug	Sep	Oct	Nov	Dec	Year
Mean daily maximum °C (°F)	30 (86)	31 (88)	33 (91)	34 (93)	33 (91)	31 (88)	30 (86)	29 (84)	30 (86)	31 (88)	31 (88)	31 (88)	31 (88)
Mean daily minimum °C (°F)	20 (68)	21 (70)	22 (72)	24 (75)	25 (77)	25 (77)	25 (77)	25 (77)	24 (75)	23 (73)	22 (72)	21 (70)	23 (74)
Average precipitation mm (inches)	15 (0.6)	16 (0.6)	24 (0.9)	33 (1.3)	102 (4.0)	121 (4.8)	177 (7.0)	165 (6.5)	144 (5.7)	170 (6.7)	56 (2.2)	23 (0.9)	1,046 (41.2)
Average rainy days	6.3	6.6	9.5	12.8	20.6	23.5	25.4	23.4	23.2	21.4	14.0	8.2	194.9
Source: Meteoblue

== Demographics ==
In the Philippine Statistics Authority 2024 census, recorded a total population of 65,256 persons based on the 2024 Census of Population and Housing (2024 CPH). This marked an increase of 2,336 persons from the 63,692 recorded in the 2020 Census of Population. The annual population growth rate (PGR) during this period was 0.76%, equivalent to about 8 additional persons per 1,000 population each year.

Population census of Agoo
Year	Pop.	±% p.a.
1903	10,653	—
1918	12,517	+1.08%
1939	13,938	+0.51%
1948	16,638	+1.99%
1960	21,093	+2.00%
1970	28,696	+3.12%
1975	32,450	+2.50%
1980	34,849	+1.44%
1990	42,698	+2.05%
1995	47,721	+2.11%
2000	51,923	+1.83%
2007	57,952	+1.53%
2010	60,596	+1.64%
2015	63,692	+0.95%
2020	66,028	+0.76%
2024	65,256	−0.28%
Source: Philippine Statistics Authority

=== Population distribution by barangay ===
Agoo is composed of 49 barangays. In 2020, San Nicolas West was the most populous barangay, accounting for 4.15% of the total municipal population. It was followed by San Agustin East (3.75%), San Manuel Norte (3.61%), San Antonio (3.56%), San Isidro (3.52%), and Nazareno (3.38%). The remaining barangays each contributed less than 3.32% of the municipal population. San Nicolas Sur, with 0.77% of the total population, remained the least populated barangay, as it was in 2015.

=== Gender composition ===
Of the total household population of 65,778 persons in 2020, males accounted for 50.56% while females comprised 49.44%, resulting in a sex ratio of 102 males for every 100 females. This ratio was consistent with the one recorded in 2015. Males made up a higher percentage of the population in the 0–64 years age group, while females outnumbered males in the age group of 65 years and above.

=== Age structure ===
In 2020, the median age of the population was 27.27 years, higher than the median age of 25.67 years recorded in 2015. The largest age groups were those aged 10 to 14 years (9.88%), followed by those aged 15 to 19 years (9.46%) and 5 to 9 years (9.24%). Males outnumbered females in the younger age groups (0–49 years), while females dominated the older age groups (50 years and above).

=== Marital status ===
Among the household population aged 10 years and older in 2020, 38.11% were married, 39.11% were never married, 14.93% were in common-law or live-in arrangements, 5.22% were widowed, and 2.62% were annulled or separated. A small percentage, 0.01%, had unknown marital status. Among the never-married population, 54.61% were males, and 45.39% were females.

=== Household size ===
In 2020, Agoo had 15,953 households, an increase from the 13,850 households recorded in 2015. The average household size was 4.1 persons, a decrease from the 4.6 persons per household recorded in 2015.

=== Ethnicity and language ===
The majority of the population in Agoo belongs to the Ilocano ethnolinguistic group, with smaller populations of Pangasinense, Tagalog, and indigenous groups such as the Bago and Ibaloi. Iloco is the primary language spoken, while Filipino and English are widely used as the mediums of instruction and communication.

=== Religion ===
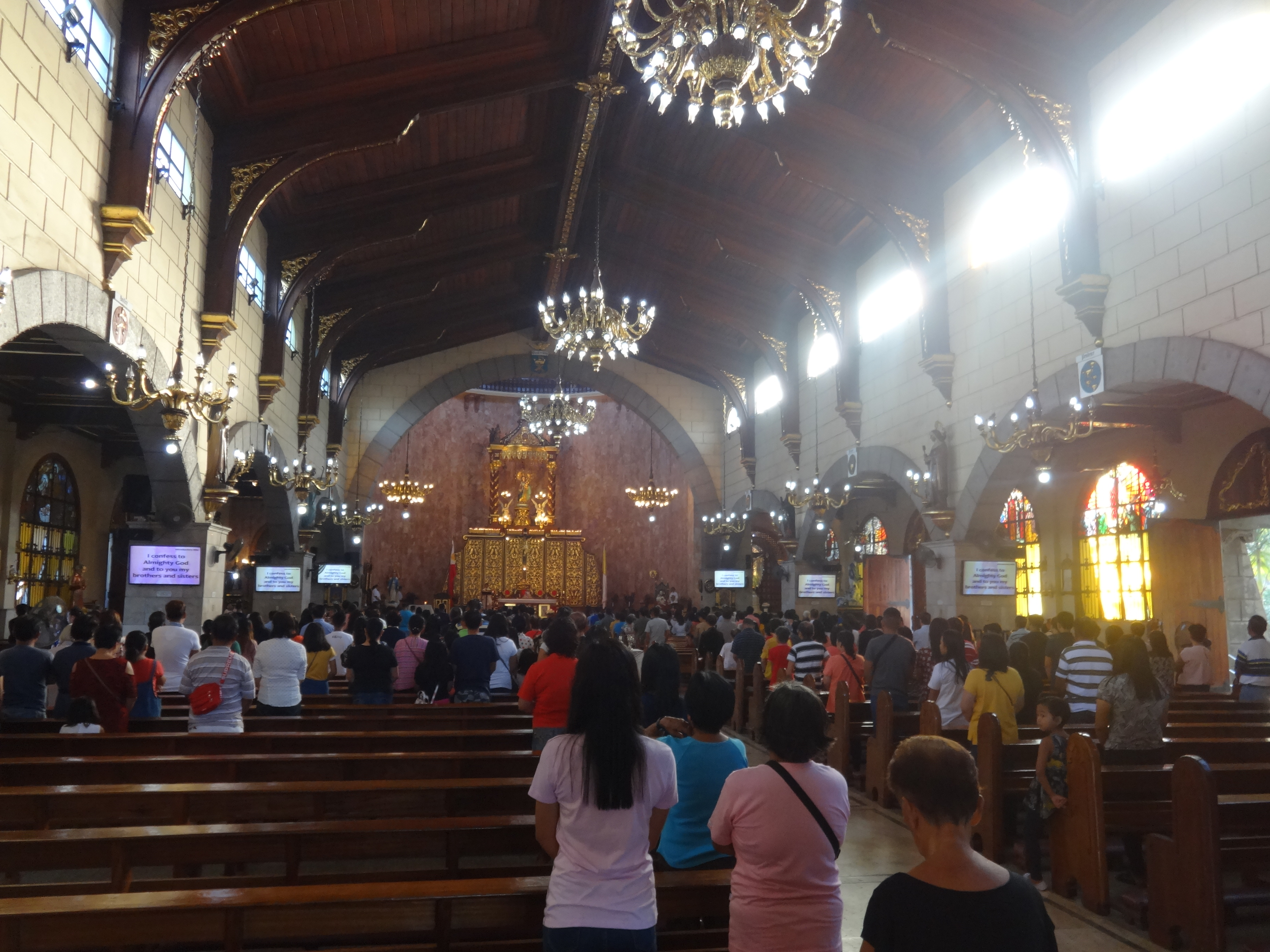
Mass in Basilica Minore of Our Lady of Charity

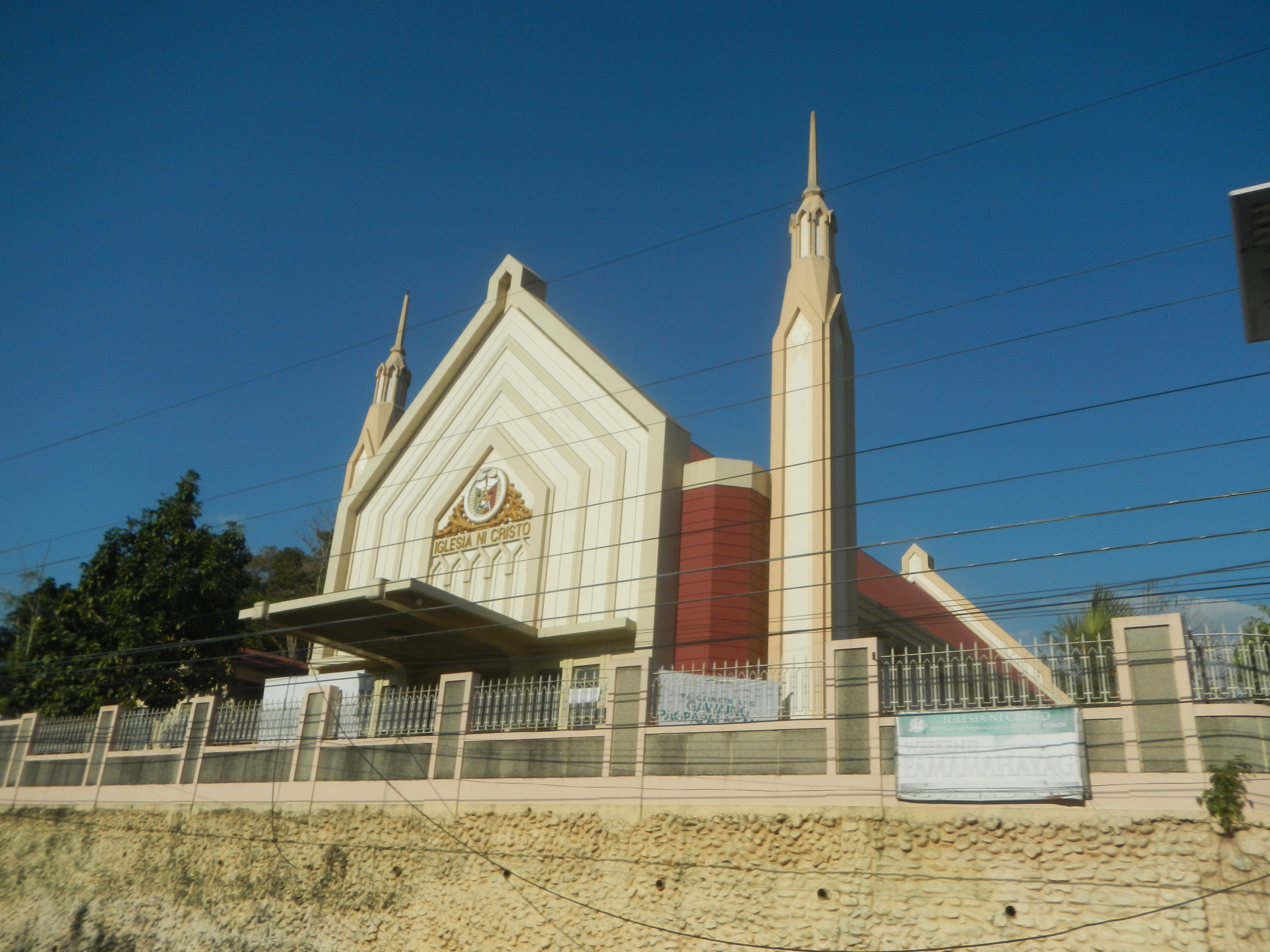
Lokal ng Agoo - Iglesia ni Cristo

Agoo is predominantly Roman Catholic, with significant numbers of people adhering to other Christian denominations, such as Iglesia ni Cristo, Protestantism, Aglipayan, Pentecostal and Jehovah's Witnesses. The municipality also hosts smaller religious communities, including those practicing Islam and Buddhism.

== Education ==
There are two schools district offices which govern the operation of educational institutions within the municipality. These are Agoo East Schools District Office, and Agoo West Schools District Office. The Schools District Offices oversee the management and operations of private and public elementary and high schools.

Among the household population aged 5 years and over, 24.97% had attended or completed elementary education, 40.57% had reached or completed high school, 10.29% were college undergraduates, and 17.04% held academic degrees. Females outnumbered males among those with academic degrees (55.80% vs. 44.20%) and among those who pursued post-baccalaureate courses (57.81% vs. 42.19%). Agoo's literacy rate in 2020 was 98.77% among the household population aged 5 years and over. The literacy rate was slightly higher among males, at 50.46%, compared to females, at 49.54%.

Agoo has 18 public elementary schools, 4 public secondary schools and 1 state university mainly Don Mariano Marcos Memorial State University-South La Union Campus (DMMMSU-SLUC), providing education to children and young adults in the area.

=== Primary and elementary schools ===
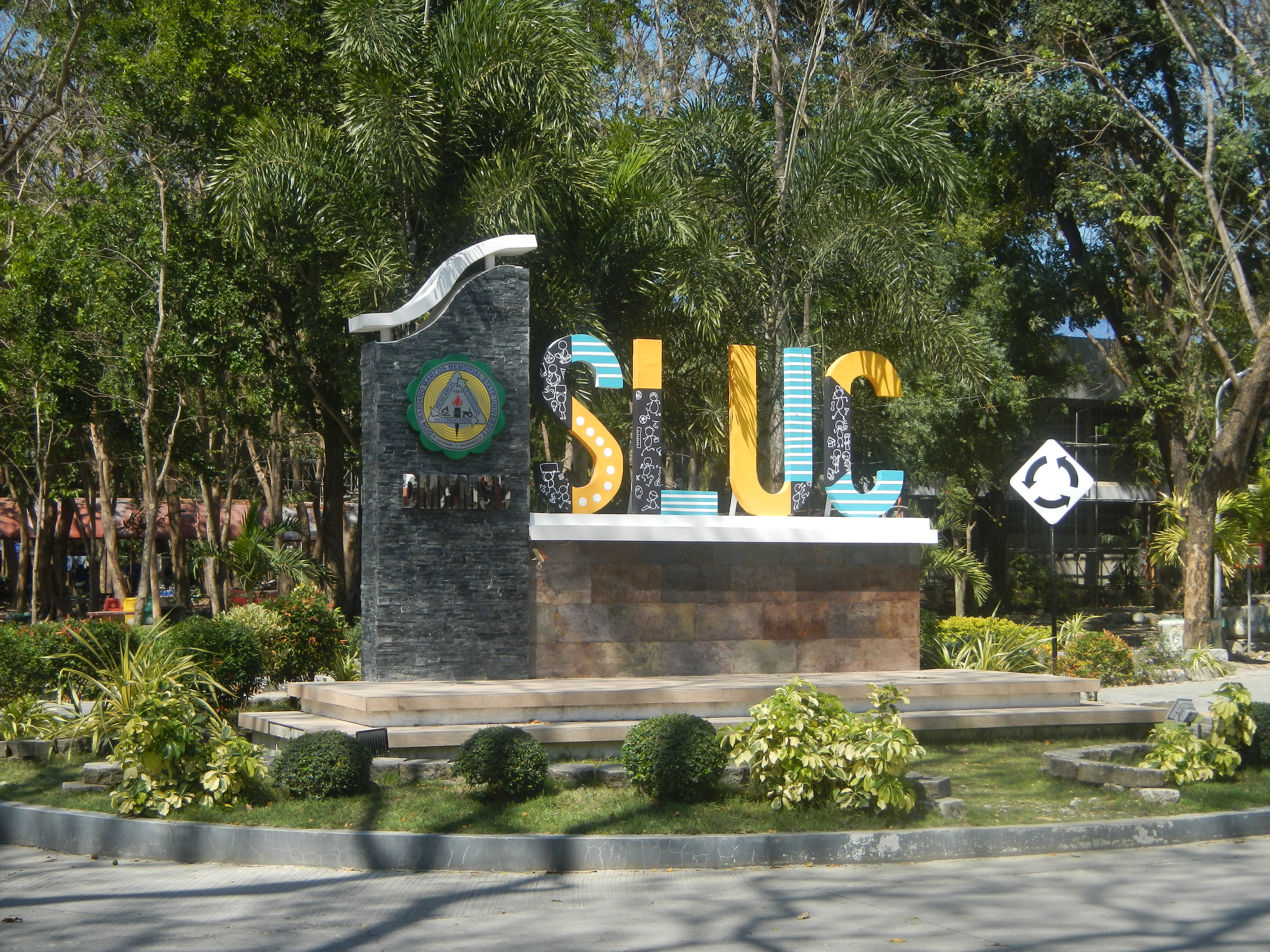
DMMMSU-South La Union Campus

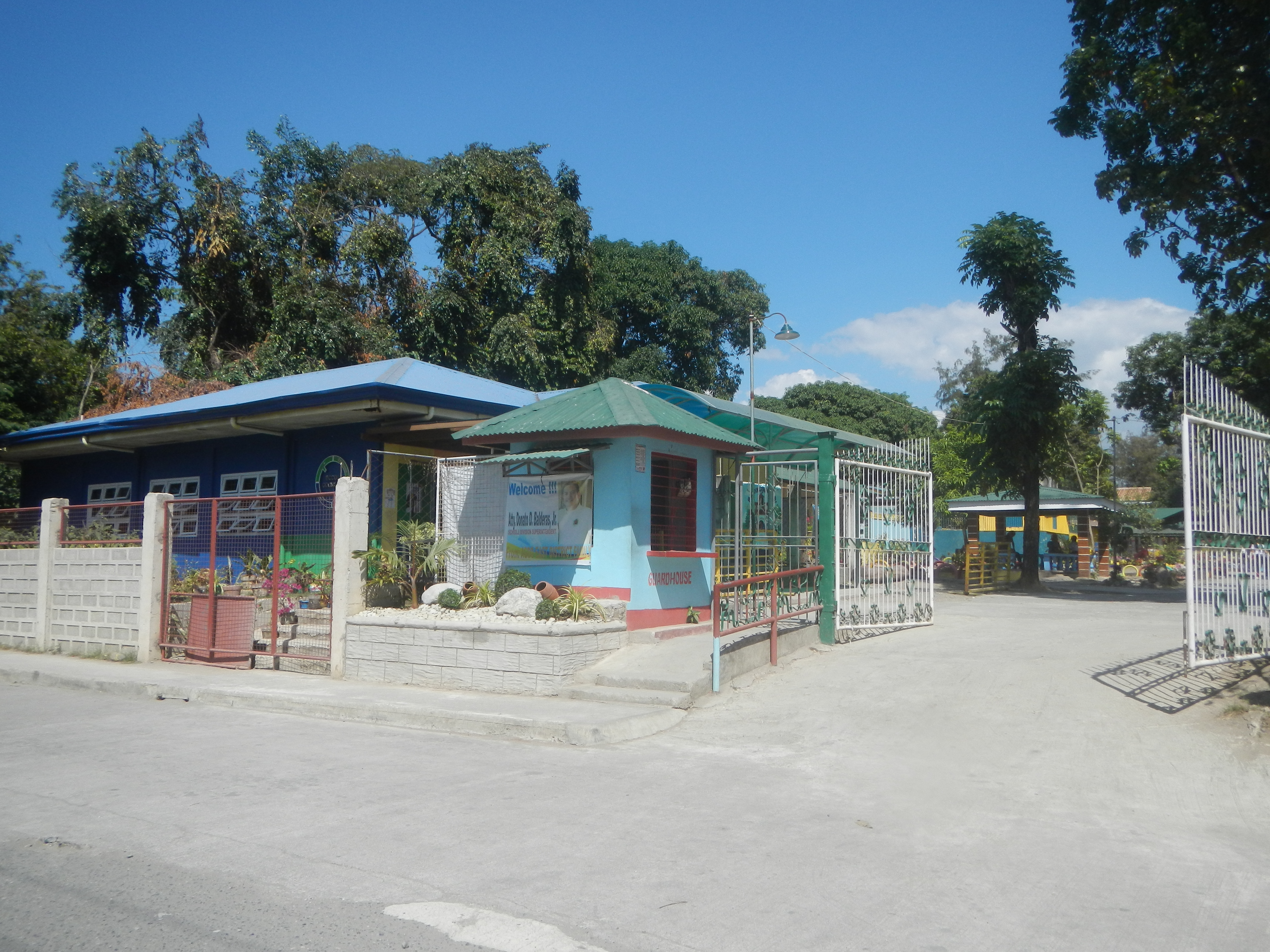
Agoo East Central School

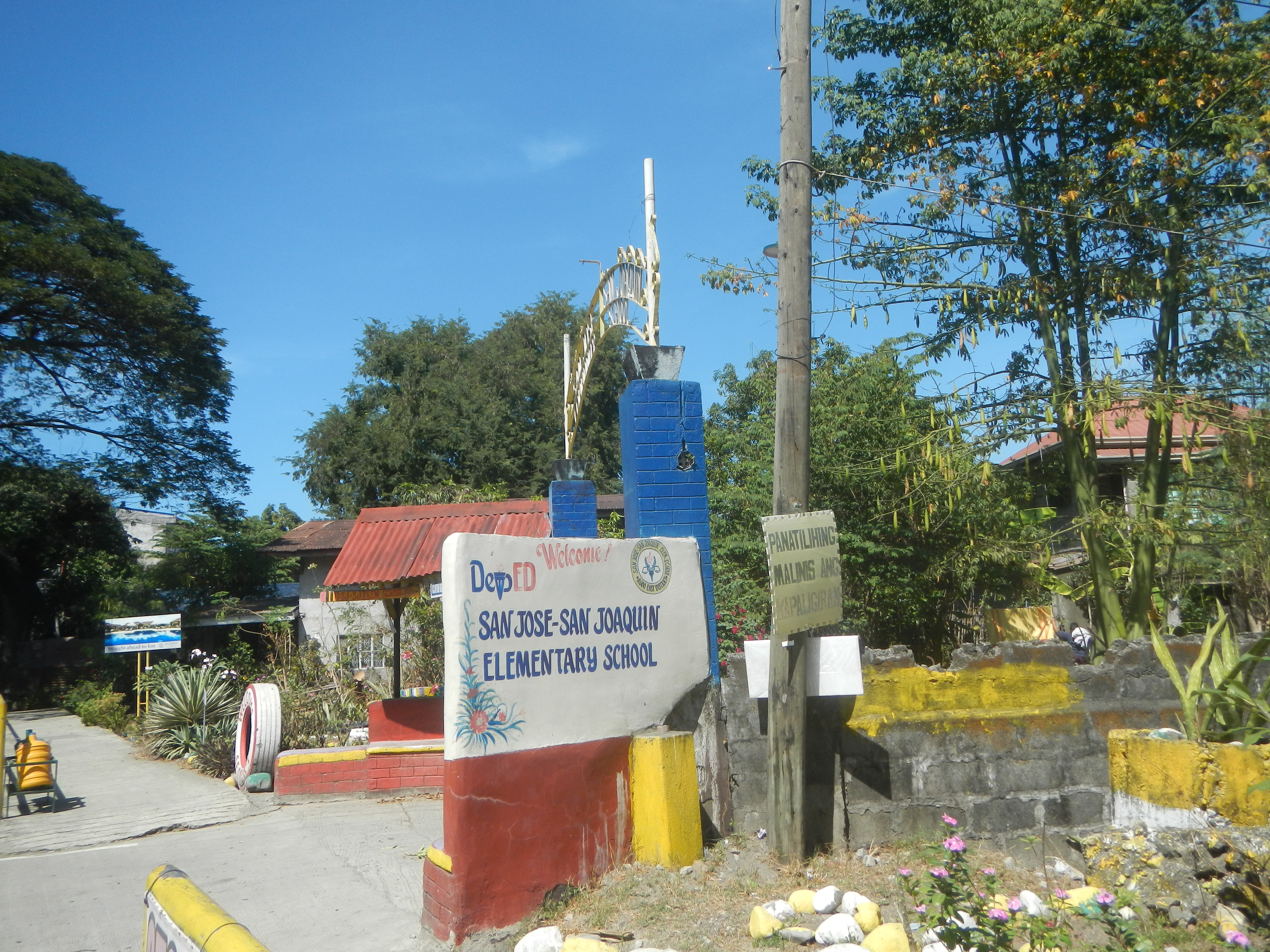
San Jose-San Joaquin Elementary School

- Agoo Children's World Montessori
- Agoo Christian Learning Center
- Agoo Kiddie Special School (Pre-Elementary & Elementary)
- Agoo Montessori Learning Center
- Agoo East Central School
- Agoo UCCP-Nursery-Kindergarten School
- Agoo West Central School
- Ambitacay Elementary School
- Assatt Christian School
- Bacsil Elementary School
- Balawarte Elementary School
- Cubal Integrated School
- Hands of Hope Faith Academy
- La Union Standard Academy
- Lord of Zion Divine School
- Lorma Grade School
- Macalva Elementary School
- Osias Educational Foundation
- Philippine Bethel Blessed Christian Academy (Elementary)
- San Joaquin Elementary School
- San Jose Elementary School
- San Jose-San Joaquin Elementary School
- San Manuel Norte Elementary School
- San Manuel Sur Elementary School
- San Nicolas Academy
- San Nicolas Elementary School
- San Vicente-San Agustin Elementary School
- Sanijubar Elementary School
- Saint Christopher Academy
- Santa Rita Elementary School
- St. Anthony Montessori Educational Network

=== Secondary schools ===
- Agoo Kiddie Special School (High School)
- Agoo Montessori Learning Center & High School
- Agoo National Vocational High School
- Capas Integrated School
- Cubal Integrated School
- Don Eufemio F. Eriguel Memorial National High School
- Dr. Manuel T. Cases Sr. National High School
- Holy Infant Niño Montessori and High School
- Libtong Integrated School
- Lorma Colleges Special Science High School
- Philippine Bethel Blessed Christian Academy (High School)
- Pres. Elpidio Quirino National High School
- St. Mary's Academy
- Stella Maris Academy

=== Higher educational institutions ===
- Don Mariano Marcos Memorial State University - South La Union Campus (DMMMSU-SLUC)
- La Union College of Science and Technology
- Lorma Colleges
- Philippine Central College of Arts & Science & Technology
- Philippine College of Northwestern Luzon
- Polytechnic College of La Union
- St. Bernard College

== Economy ==
Agoo is a first-class municipality with a poverty incidence of 8.67% as of 2021. The town's economy is primarily driven by agriculture, fishing, small-scale industries, and a growing focus on local businesses and tourism. As according to Cities and Municipalities Competitiveness Index 2023 the economy of Agoo is rated at 25% for economic dynamism. It ranks 16th in Local Economy Structure, showing strong economic foundations.

Poverty incidence of Agoo (%)

Source: Philippine Statistics Authority

The municipality is 28th in the Presence of Business and Professional Organizations, indicating a good business presence. It ranks 38th in Increase in Employment, reflecting moderate employment growth. Safety Compliant Business is ranked 48th, showing a reasonable level of compliance. Agoo ranks 98th in Cost of Living, indicating relative affordability. The municipality ranks 92nd in Local Economy Size, reflecting a modest economic scale. Productivity ranks 55th, showing average output levels. Financial Deepening is ranked 54th, reflecting moderate financial activity. The Cost of Doing Business is ranked 57th, indicating competitive costs. However, Local Economy Growth is ranked 218th, showing slow economic growth.

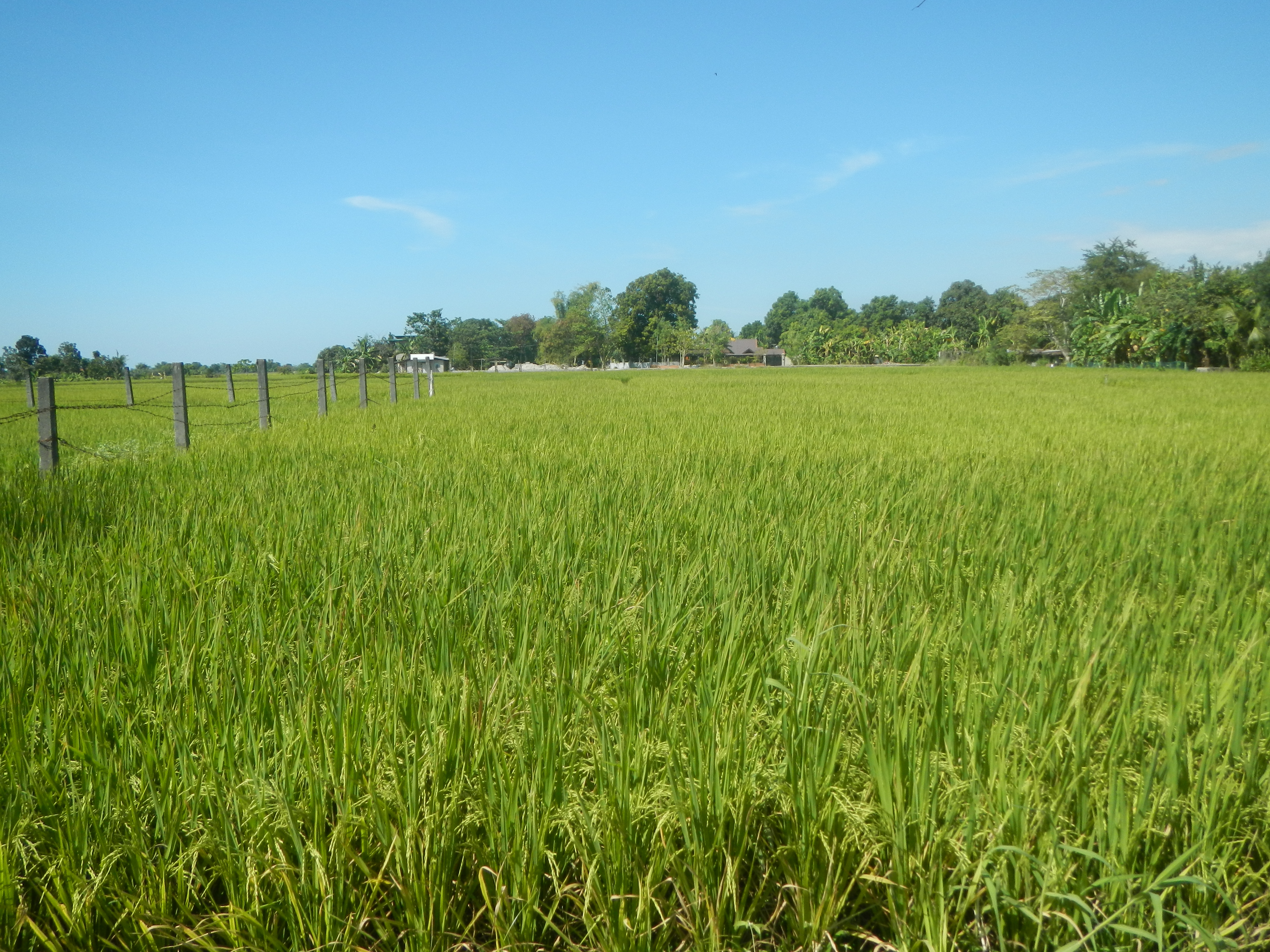
Rice field in San Agustin Norte

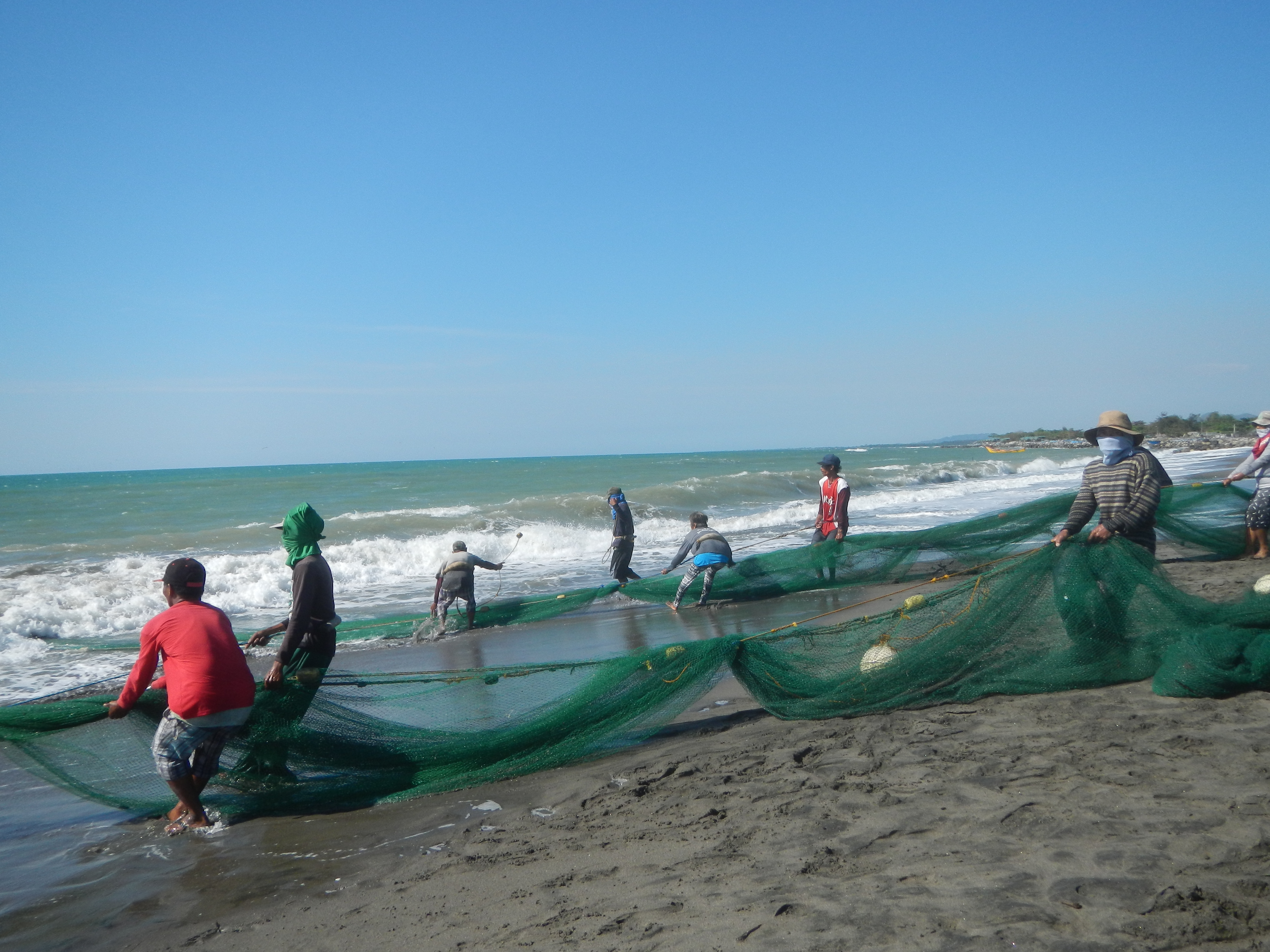
Fisherfolks in San Isidro

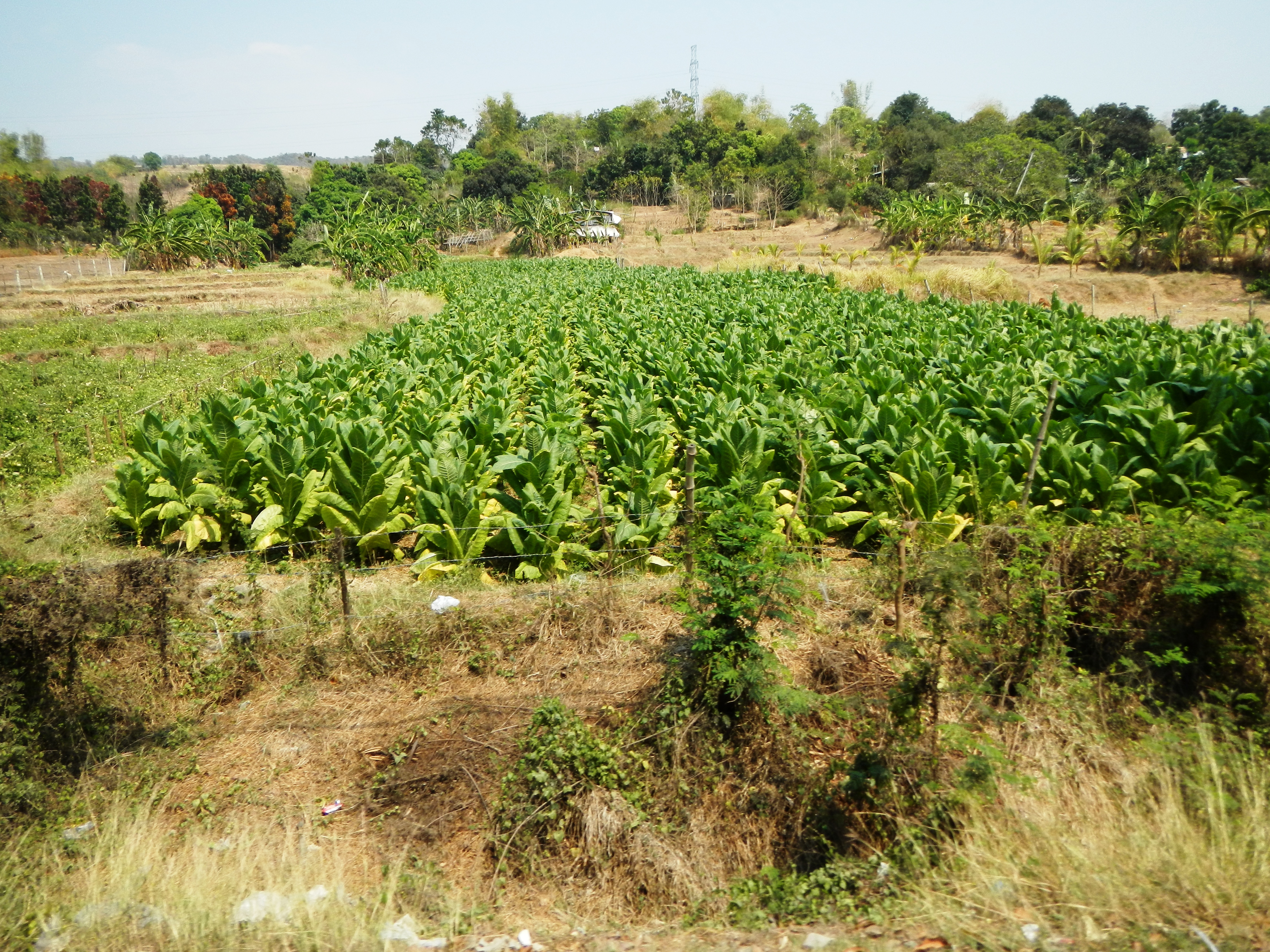
Tobacco field

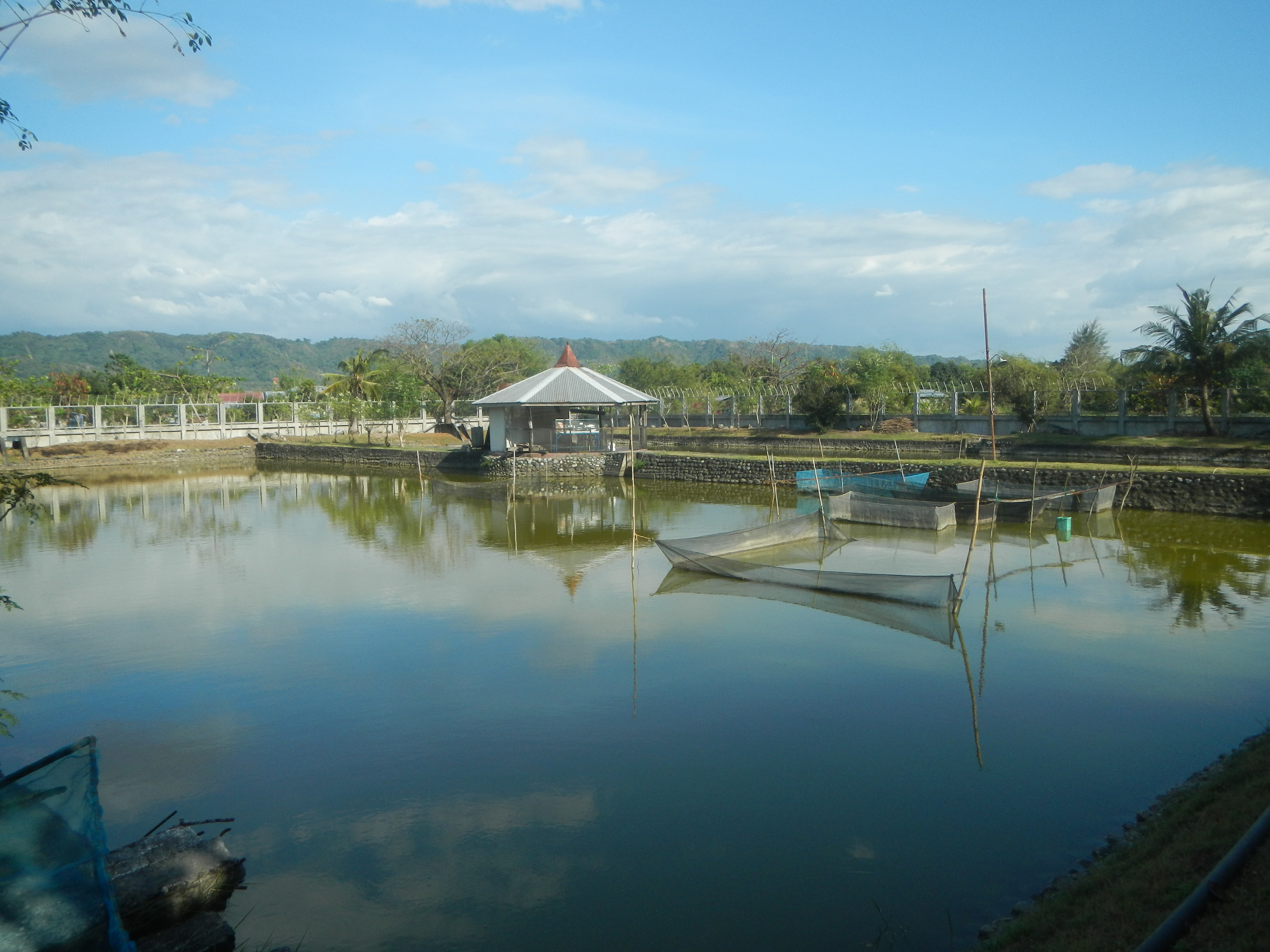
Fishponds in Santa Rita

=== Agriculture ===
Agriculture is the main source of livelihood for the residents of Agoo due to its vast agricultural lands. The town's fields primarily cultivate rice, tobacco, corn, sugarcane, fruits, vegetables, and root crops. In addition, fungiculture, the practice of cultivating mushrooms, is prevalent in the town and has been recognized as part of the municipality's One Town, One Product (OTOP) initiative.

=== Fishing and aquaculture ===
Fishing is another key livelihood in Agoo, particularly in its coastal areas along Lingayen Gulf and the South China Sea. Aquaculture is also a major industry in the town, with residents engaged in the cultivation of tilapia and bangus (milkfish), which are important for both local consumption and trade.

=== Livestock farming ===
Livestock farming, particularly the raising of poultry, swine, cattle, carabao (water buffalo), and goats, is an essential part of the economy. These animals are raised for meat, egg, dairy, and other products, contributing significantly to both local consumption and trade within the region.

=== Small-scale industries ===
Industries such as basketry and woodcarving are also prominent in Agoo. These traditional crafts are part of the town's cultural heritage and provide livelihoods for local artisans. Products like handmade baskets and wood carvings are sold in both local markets and regional outlets, supporting the town's economic activities.

=== Small businesses ===
In the town proper, small businesses such as sari-sari stores, local restaurants, trading and others play an important role in the local economy. These businesses provide essential goods and services to the community and contribute to Agoo's economic development, with a growing emphasis on entrepreneurship and local commerce.

== Government ==
=== Local government ===
Just as the national government, the municipal government of Agoo, is divided into three branches: executive, legislative, and judiciary. The judicial branch is administered solely by the Supreme Court of the Philippines. The LGUs have control of the executive and legislative branches.

The executive branch is composed of the mayor and the barangay captain for the barangays.Local Government Code of the Philippines, Book III, Department of the Interior and Local Government official website.

The legislative branch is composed of the Sangguniang Bayan (town assembly), Sangguniang Barangay (barangay council), and the Sangguniang Kabataan for the youth sector.

The seat of Government is vested upon the Mayor and other elected officers who hold office at the Townhall. The Sangguniang Bayan is the center of legislation, stationed in Agoo Municipio.

=== Elected officials ===
Members of the Municipal Council (2025)
Position	Name
Congressman	Dante S. Garcia
Mayor	Frank O. Sibuma
Vice-Mayor	Antonio A. Eslao
Councilors	Mark Anthony Refugia
Councilors	Precy Komiya
Councilors	Tonet Quero
Councilors	Robert Fontanilla
Councilors	Reynaldo Oller
Councilors	Steve Lomboy
Councilors	Jean Boado
Councilors	Rogelio Garabiles

== Tourism ==
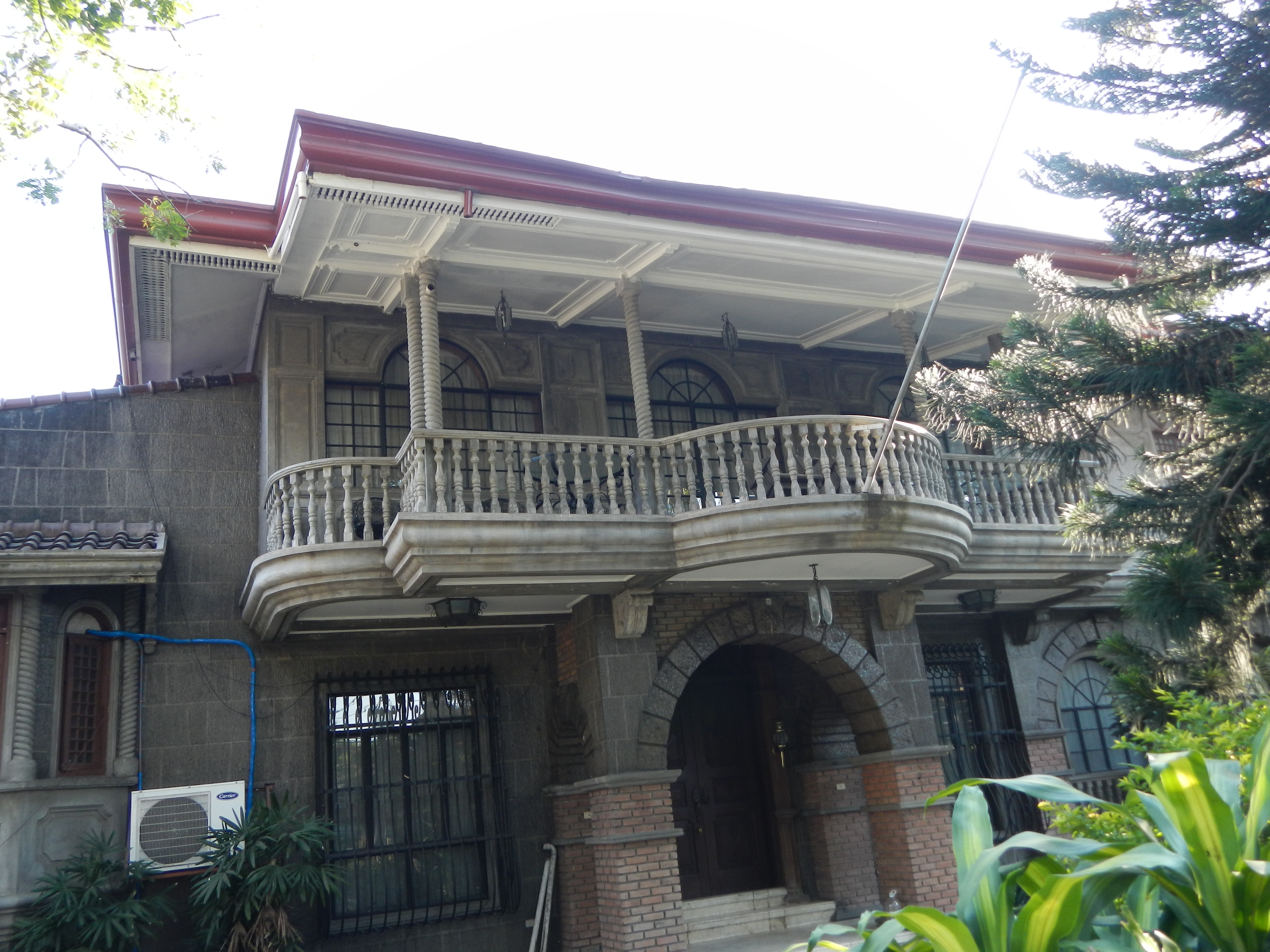
Jose D. Aspiras ancestral house

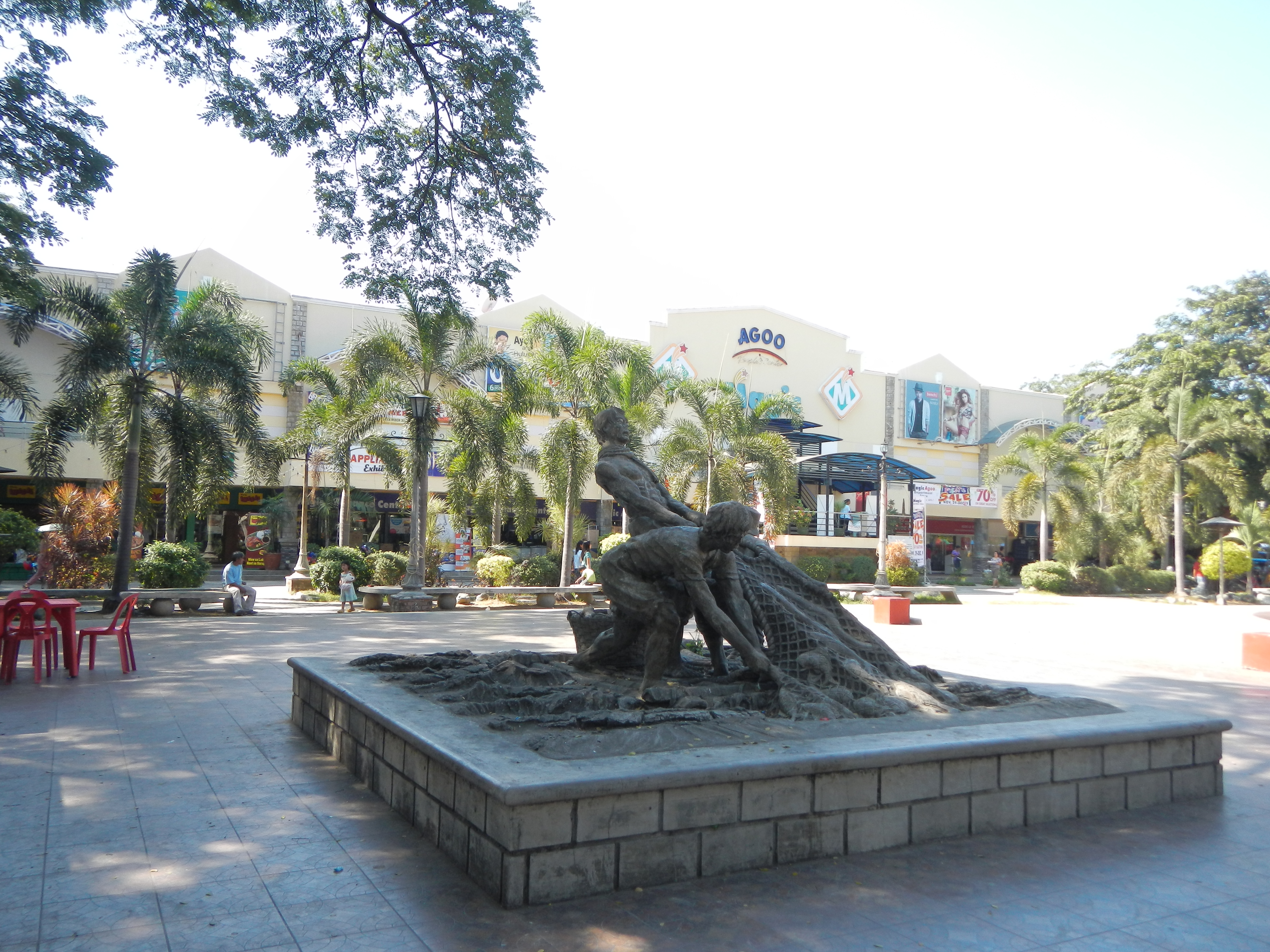
The redeveloped Imelda Garden

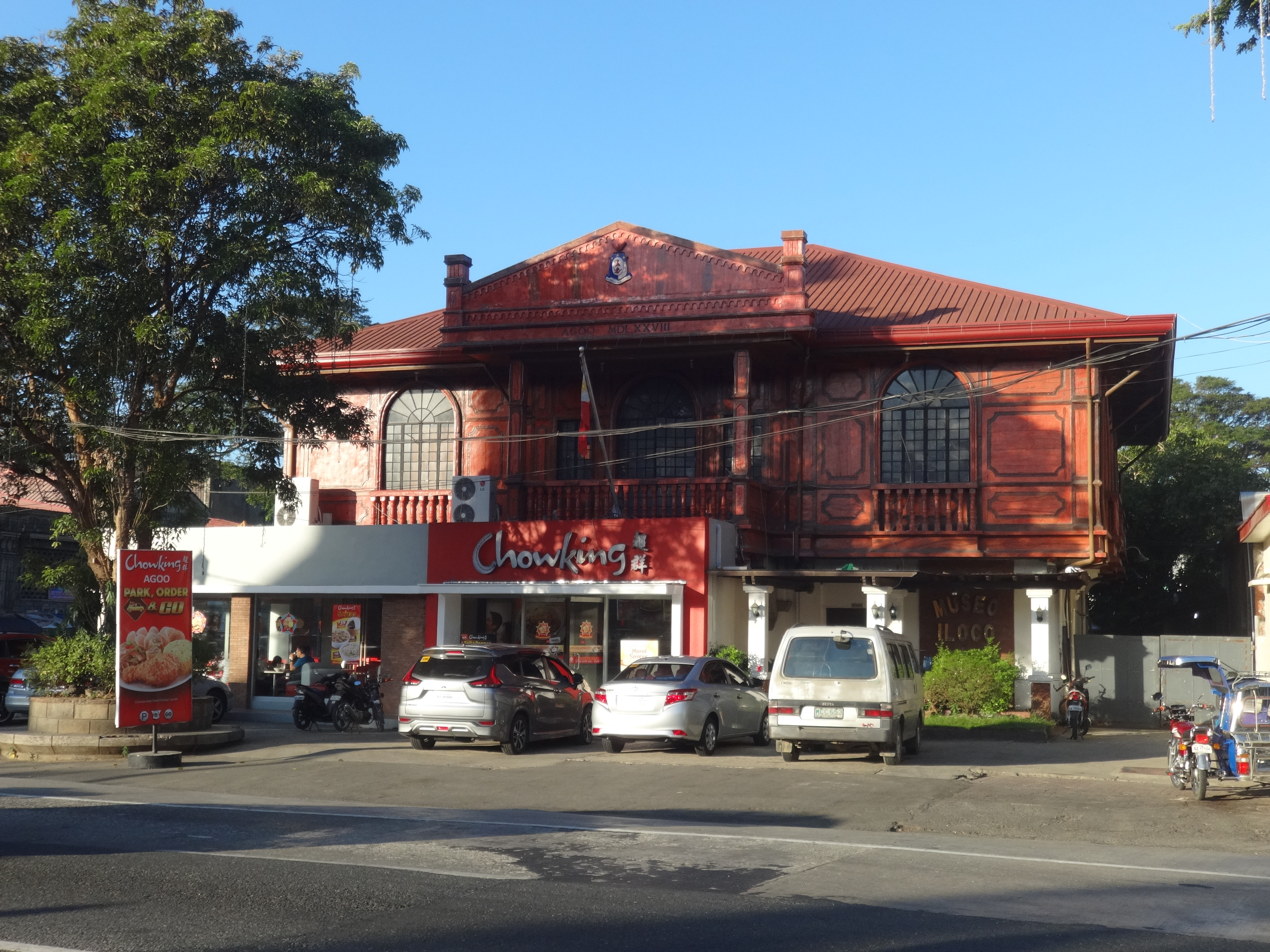
Museo de Iloko

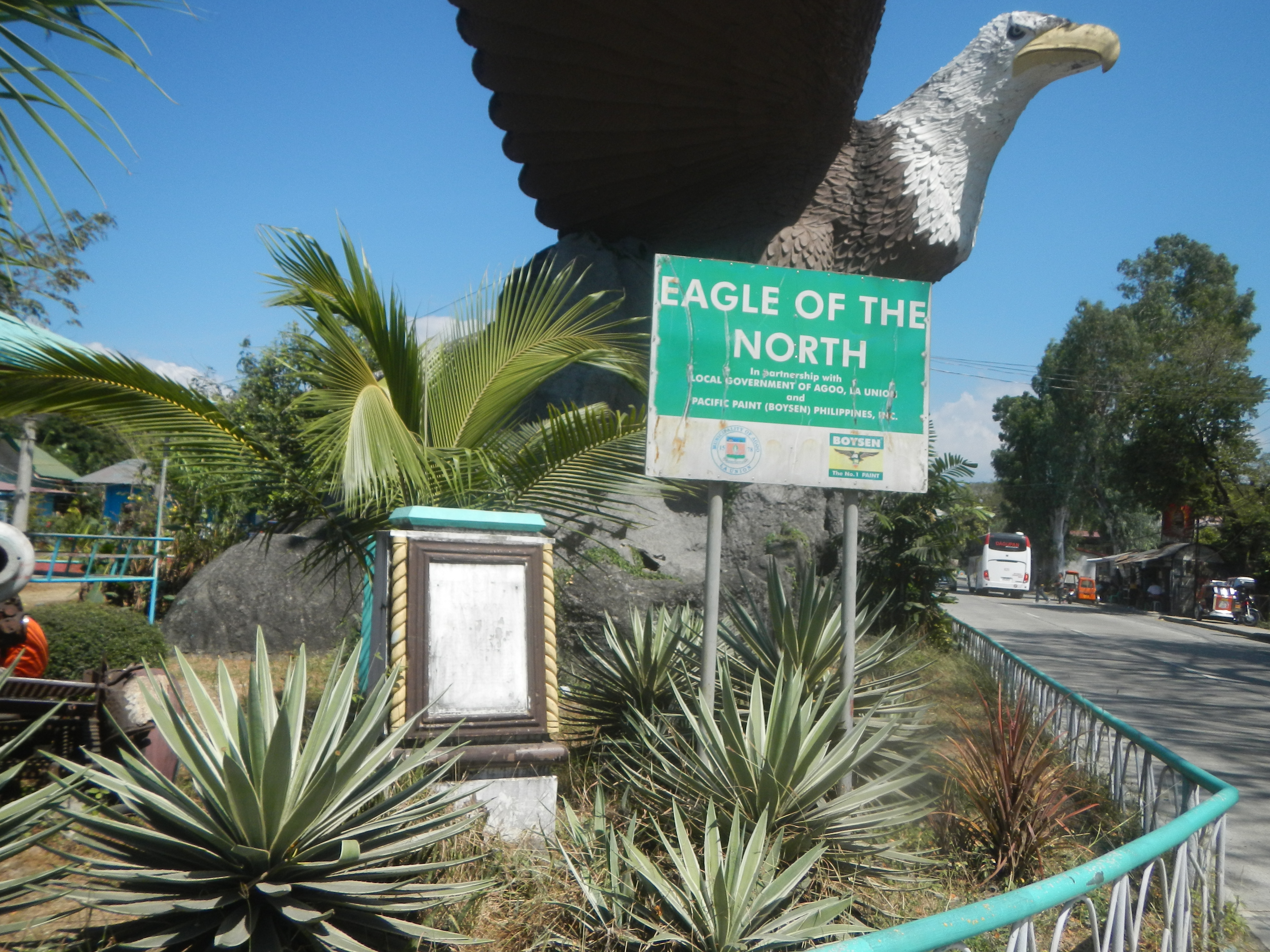
Eagle of the North

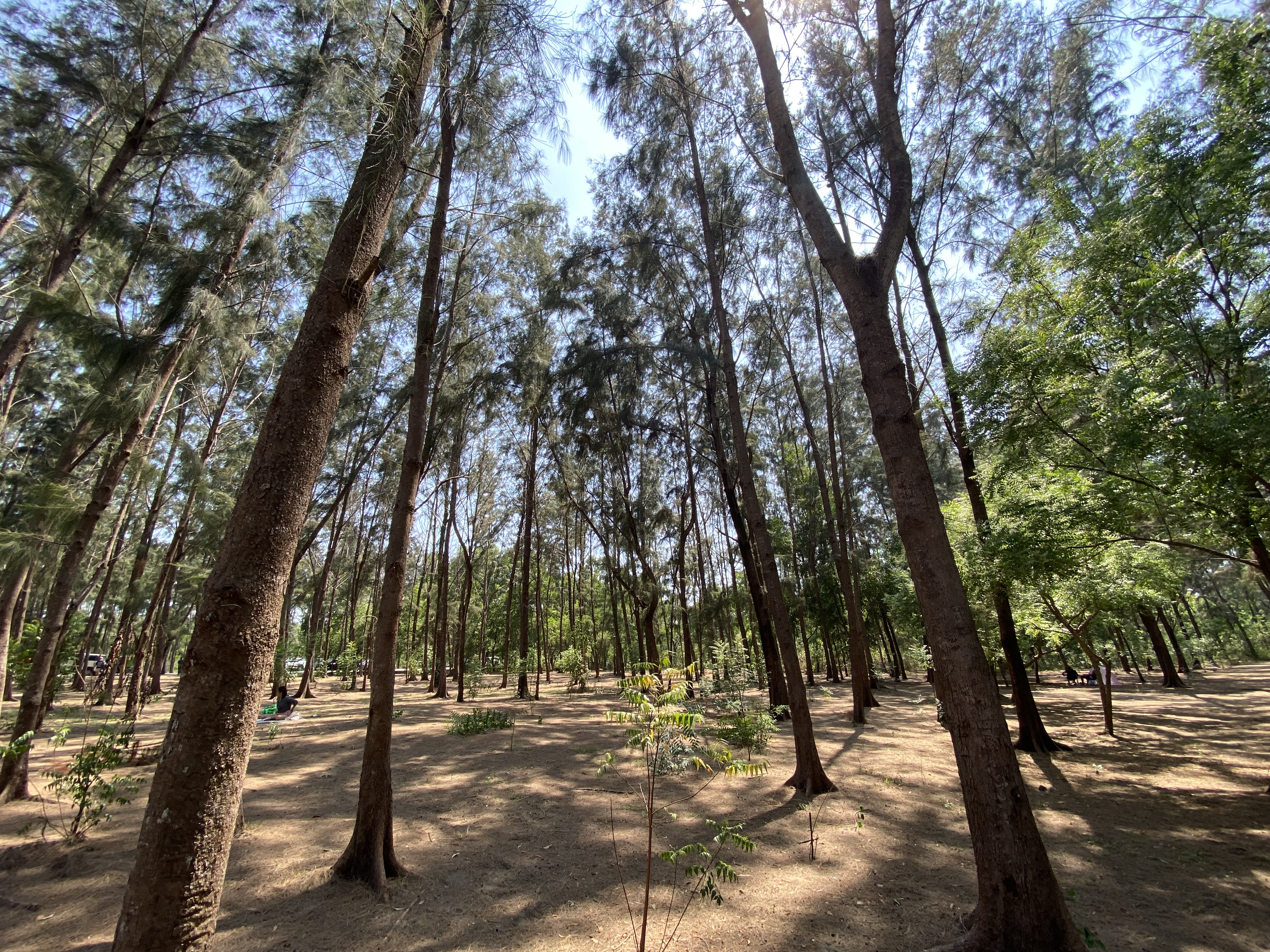
Agoo-Damortis Protected Landscape and Seascape

Agoo has the following attractions and main festival/events:

=== Cultural and architectural attractions ===
- Basilica Minore of Our Lady of Charity
- Museo de Iloko - The 1979 Museo de La Union or Museo Iloko was the former Presidencia of Agoo (restored by the Philippine Tourism Authority in 1981).
- Eagle of the North Park - a giant eagle structure designed by Arch. Anselmo Day-ag as a Symbol of Marcoses' power.
- Agoo Presidencia and New Town Hall
- Agoo Welcome Arch (1578)
- Plaza de la Virgen
- Don Mariano Marcos Memorial State University (Marcos Sports Center) DMMMSU-South La Union Campus
- Imelda Garden (fishermen sculpture, Agoo Town Square and Town Plaza)
- Jose D. Aspiras ancestral house
- Jose D. Aspiras Civic Center
- Our Lady of Lourdes Grotto

=== Nature attractions ===
- Agoo–Damortis Protected Landscape and Seascape
- Agoo Eco-Park (Sta. Rita West/Central)
- Agoo Beach (San Nicolas West)
- Camp Wagi (Brgy. Capas)
- San Antonio-San Miguel Eco-Mountain Trail
- Lakay Ago Nature Park (San Agustin East)

=== Festivals ===
- Dinengdeng festival and Patronal Town Fiesta (April 26 to May 4)
- Agoo Kilawin (Ceviche) Festival, December 28, 2011

=== Other attractions ===
- San Roque West-San Roque East fish ponds
- Aspiras-Palispis Highway (formerly the Marcos Highway and Agoo-Baguio Road), connecting Agoo to Baguio City

== Notable personalities ==
- Jose D. Aspiras - Secretary of Tourism (Philippines) during the Marcos administration.
- Antonio L. Mabutas - Bishop of the Roman Catholic Archdiocese of Davao from (1972–1996), noted as one of the first Catholic Bishops to officially criticize the Human rights abuses of the Marcos dictatorship.
- Judiel Nieva (also known as Angel de la Vega) - transgender actress and businesswoman notable for her claims of seeing a vision of the Virgin Mary atop a guava tree in Agoo in what was labeled as the "Miracle of Agoo" from 1989 until 1993.
- Jessica Soho - broadcast journalist affiliated with GMA Network.

== Image gallery ==
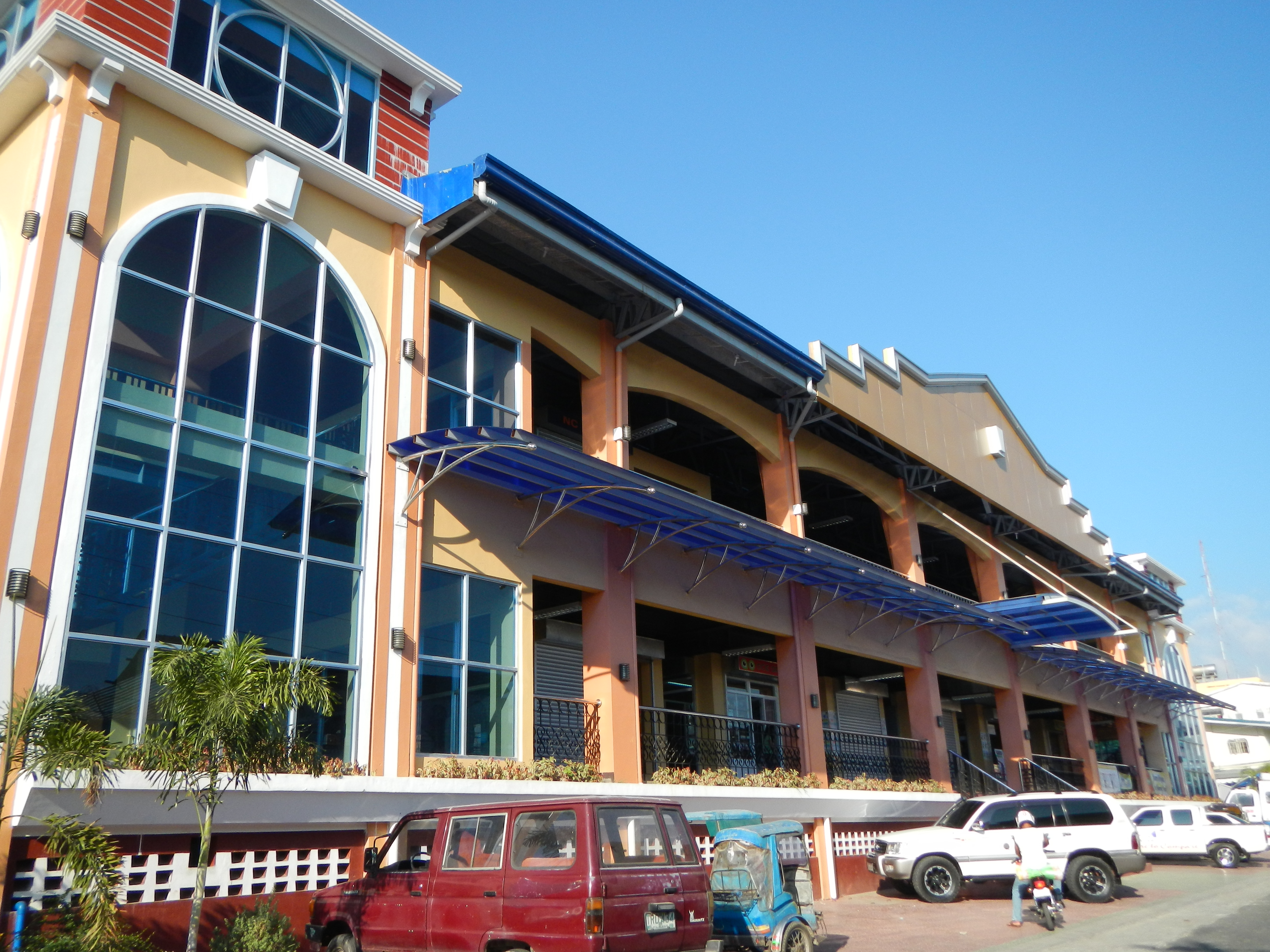
Agoo Public Market

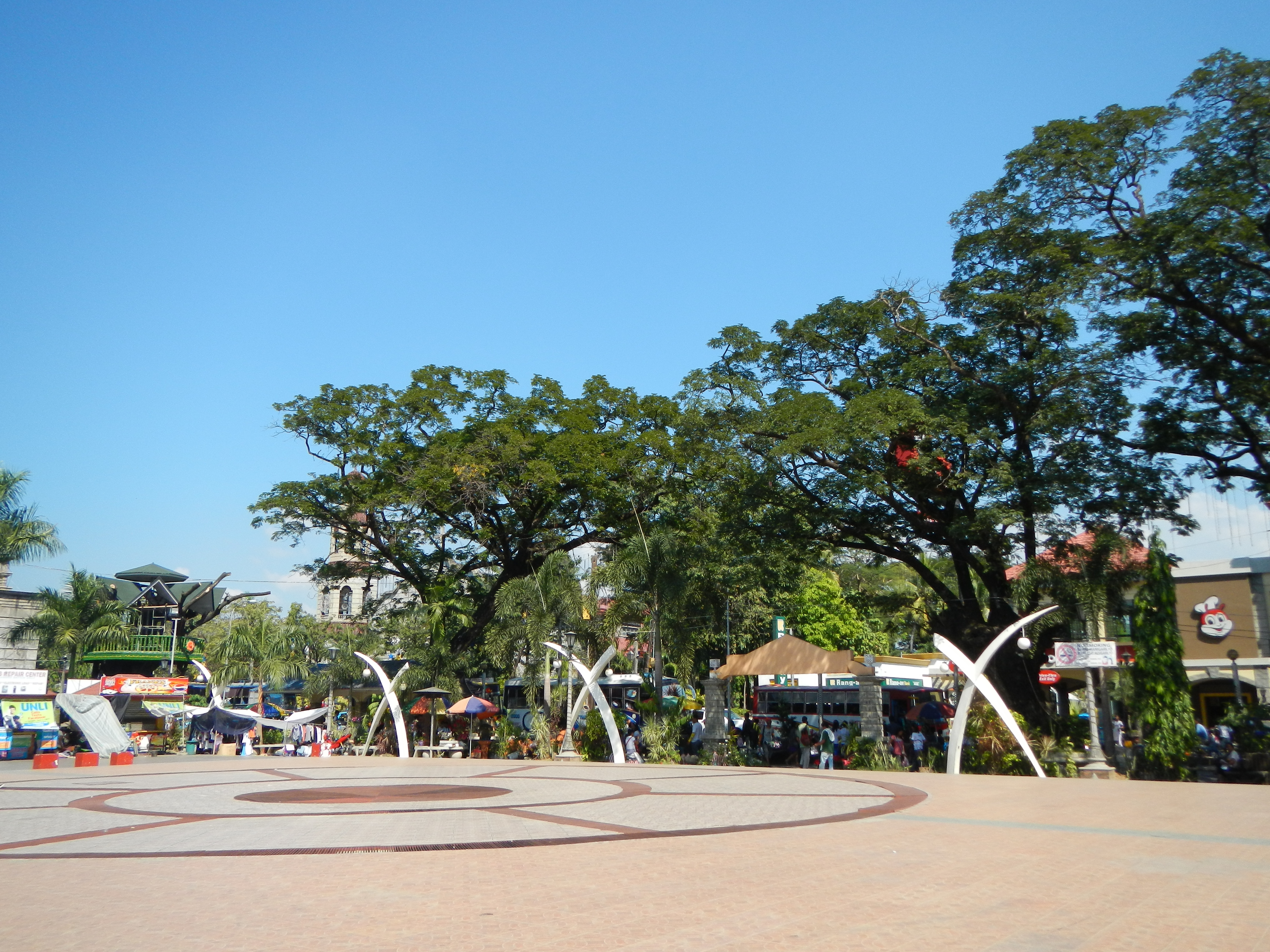
Town Plaza

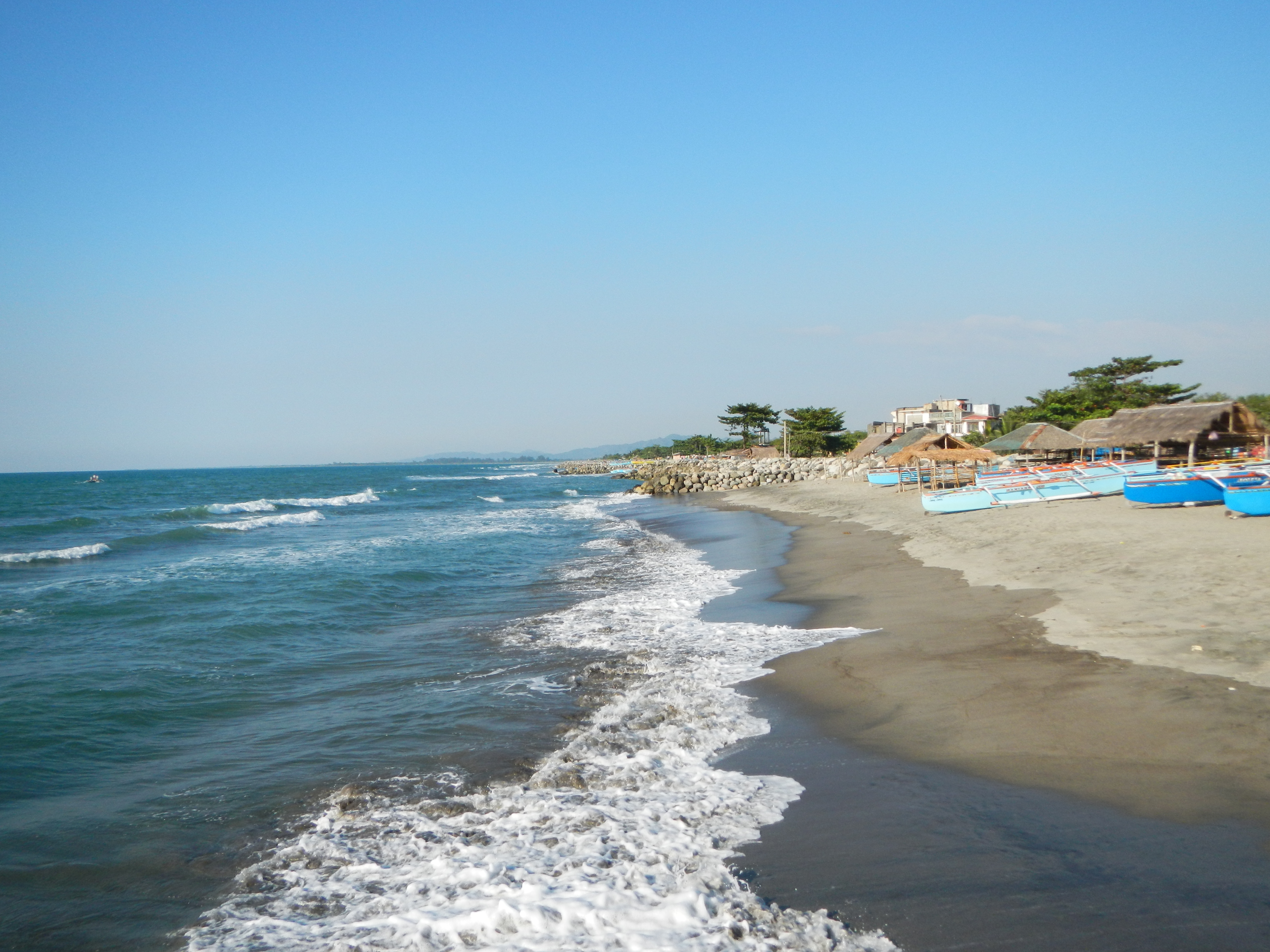
Agoo beach (San Nicolas East)

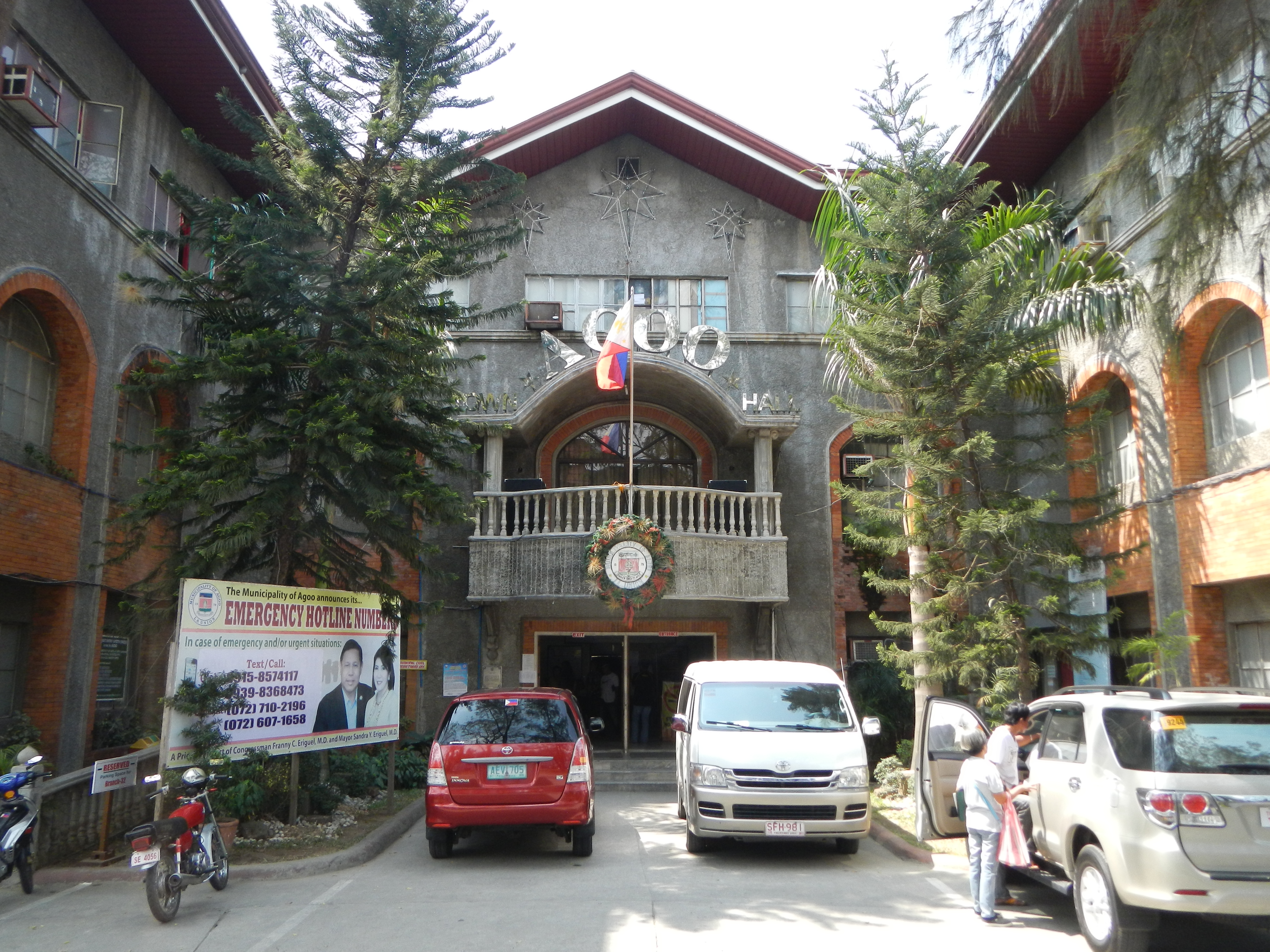
Agoo Town Hall

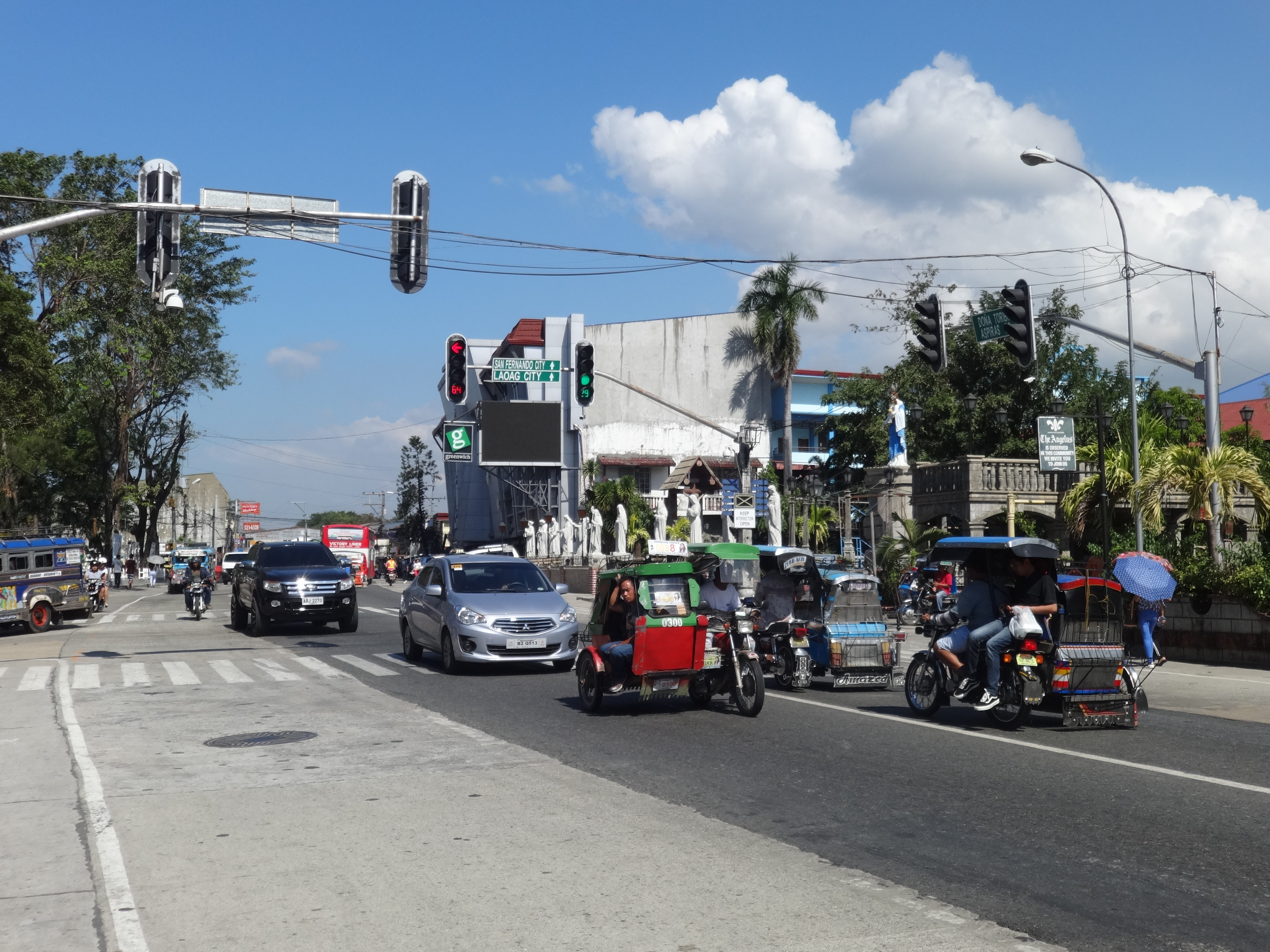
Town Proper
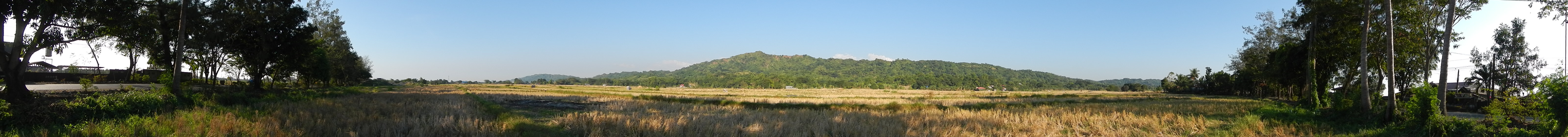
Panorama of Agoo hills and rice-fields
