= Judiel Nieva =

Filipino transgender actress and businesswoman

- Born: 1977 (age 48–49); Agoo, La Union, Philippines
- Other name: Angel de la Vega
- Occupations: Actress, entertainer, businesswoman
- Known for: Apparitions by the Blessed Virgin Mary

Judiel Nieva (born 1977), also known as Angel de la Vega, is a Filipino transgender actress and businesswoman, notable for her claims of seeing a vision of the Virgin Mary atop a guava tree in Agoo, La Union, Philippines in what was labeled as the "Miracle of Agoo" from 1989 until 1993. During this time, the noted Filipino broadcaster Noli de Castro was instrumental in the national broadcasting of the purported apparitions in the Philippines.

The Catholic Church officially declared Nieva's visions as non-supernatural in 1993.

== Early life ==
Nieva is the seventh of eight children. Her parents Pedro and Julia Nieva sold goods out of two stalls which they operated in the local market. Even as a young child, Nieva was believed to have special powers and was sought out as a healer.

== Purported Marian apparitions ==
Our Lady Immaculate, Queen of Heaven in Agoo
- Location: Agoo, La Union
- Date: 1987-1993
- Witness: Judiel Nieva later known as Angel de la Vega
- Type: Marian apparition
- Approval: Not Approved; Rejected: (1993)

Nieva claimed to have begun seeing visions of the Virgin Mary in 1987 when she was only 10 years old. On March 31, 1989, she reported that the first of several public apparitions, in which she claimed to have seen a bright light, then heard voices and the sounds of trumpets while angels descended from heaven towards her singing "Allelulia" and "Salve Regina".

The Holy Family next appeared on a cloud, Saint Joseph holding a shepherd's staff and the Virgin Mary sitting on a rock holding the baby Jesus on her lap.

=== Description of the Blessed Virgin Mary ===
The description of the Blessed Virgin Mary according to Nieva's personalized statue is distinct. The Virgin Mary wears a long white tunic, and stands atop a (Guava) tree resting on a cloud decorated with seven roses. The virgin has a six-pointed star on the forehead, and has a "Sailor knot" with a tassel and a golden chain ball hanging from her chest.

The Marian title associated with the weeping statue later became known as "Our Lady of Agoo, Immaculate Queen of Heaven and Earth" and features seven roses atop a cloud where the virgin stands.

The public was initially inclined to believe Nieva's claims. On March 6, 1993, during a "manifestation" on "Apparition Hill", an estimated one million people gathered to witness a "visitation" from the Virgin Mary. Numerous government officials, media personalities and even a Catholic bishop attested to the veracity of these events.

In 1993, a theological commission established by Bishop Salvador Lazo condemned the aforementioned events as Constat de Non Supernaturalitate (Latin, "clearly evident to be not supernatural"). Accounts reported in the news media regarding the financial corruption of the discredited seer's family and her own transsexualism were seen as proof of this finding.

The statue was reported to have wept tears of blood on three occasions.

In September 2003, during a public televised interview on The Buzz by Kris Aquino, Nieva was asked if the Virgin Mary has continued to appear, Nieva refused to answer and asked to no longer talk about the topic in order to allow her to move on. Nieva also noted that in July of the same year, she was involved in a car accident but survived, along with her driver. In another interview by GMA Network, a host asked Nieva what prompted her to undergo gender confirmation surgery. Nieva empathically answered "Ito po ang Kagustuhan ng Mahal na Birhen" (English: "This is what the Beloved Virgin Mary willed (for me).").

== Acting career ==
In 2003, Nieva, who now calls herself by the screen name "Angel dela Vega", starred in a film entitled Siklo. In the film, she plays a woman who falls in love with her neighbor.
