= Aringay =

Municipality in La Union, Philippines

- Municipality
- Municipality of Aringay
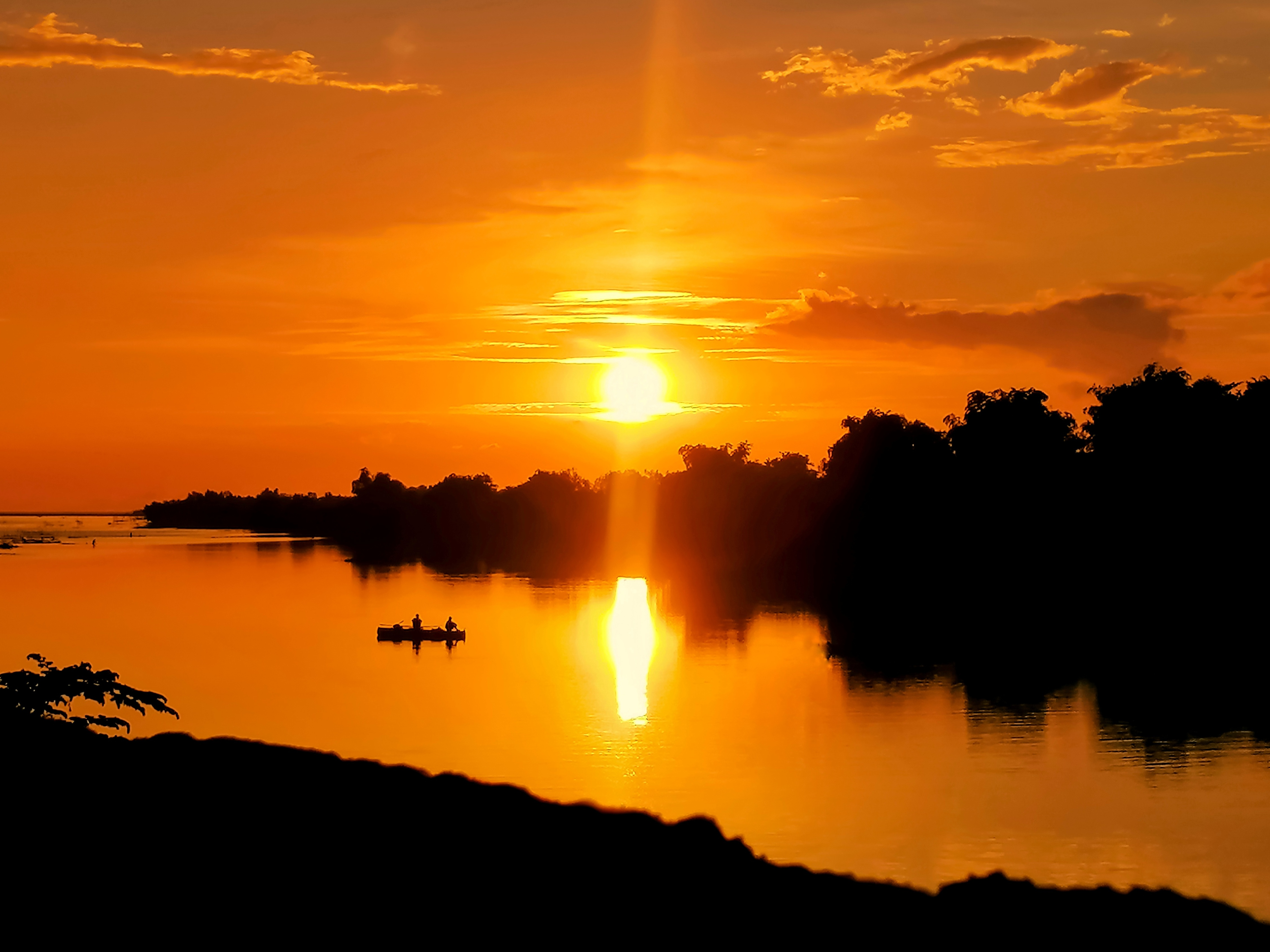
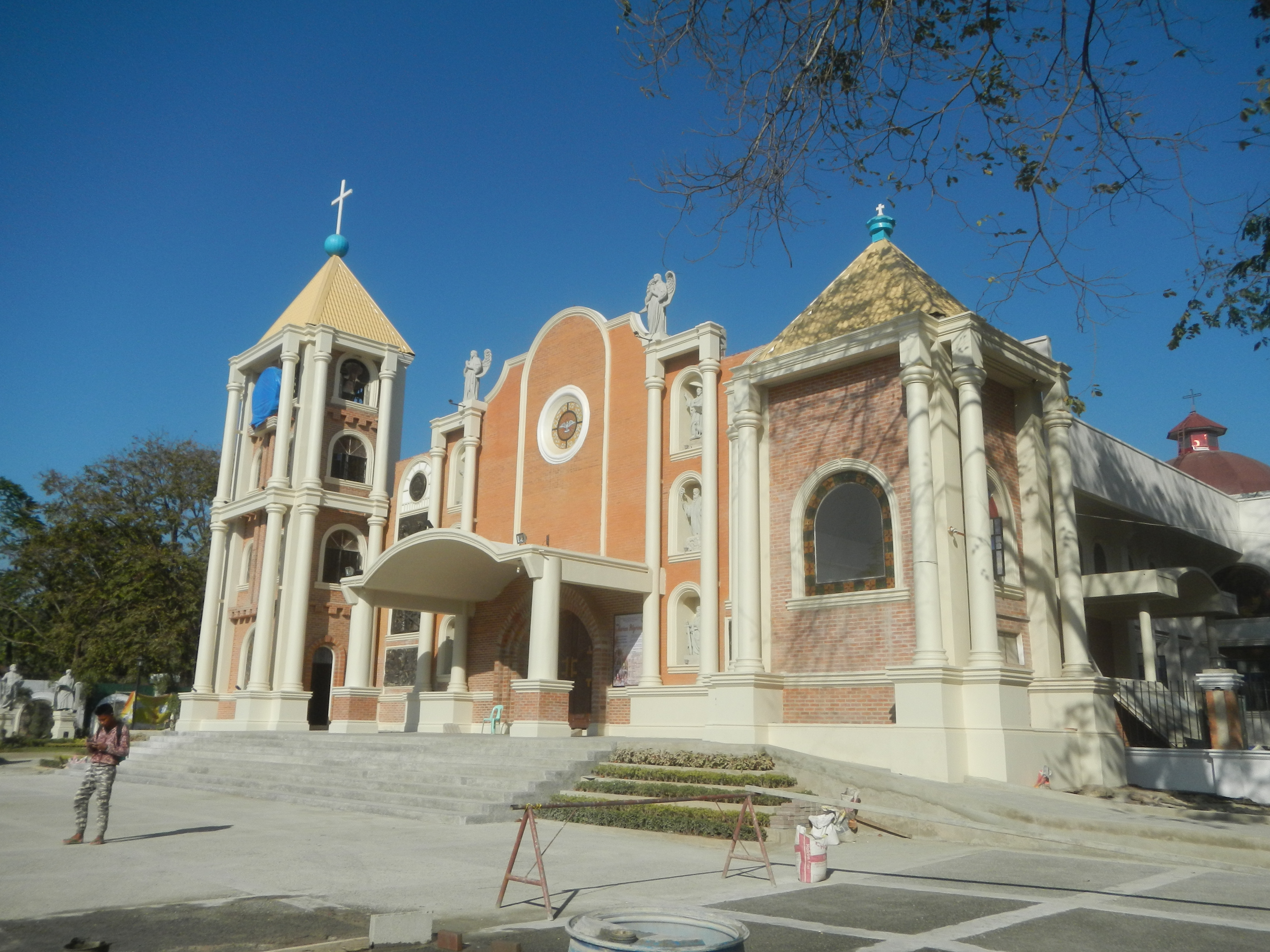
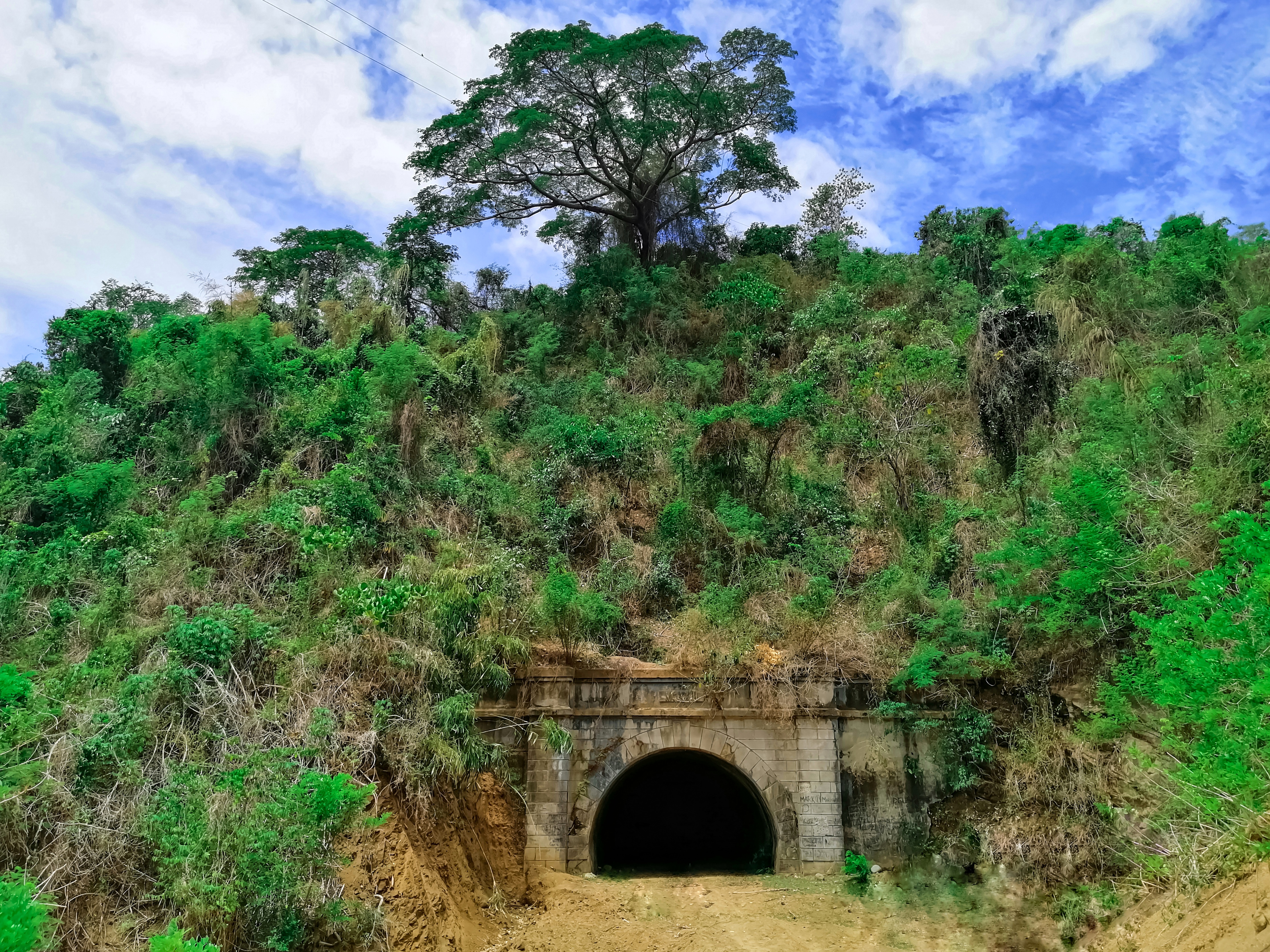
- Aringay River, St. Lucy Parish Church and Aringay Centennial Tunnel

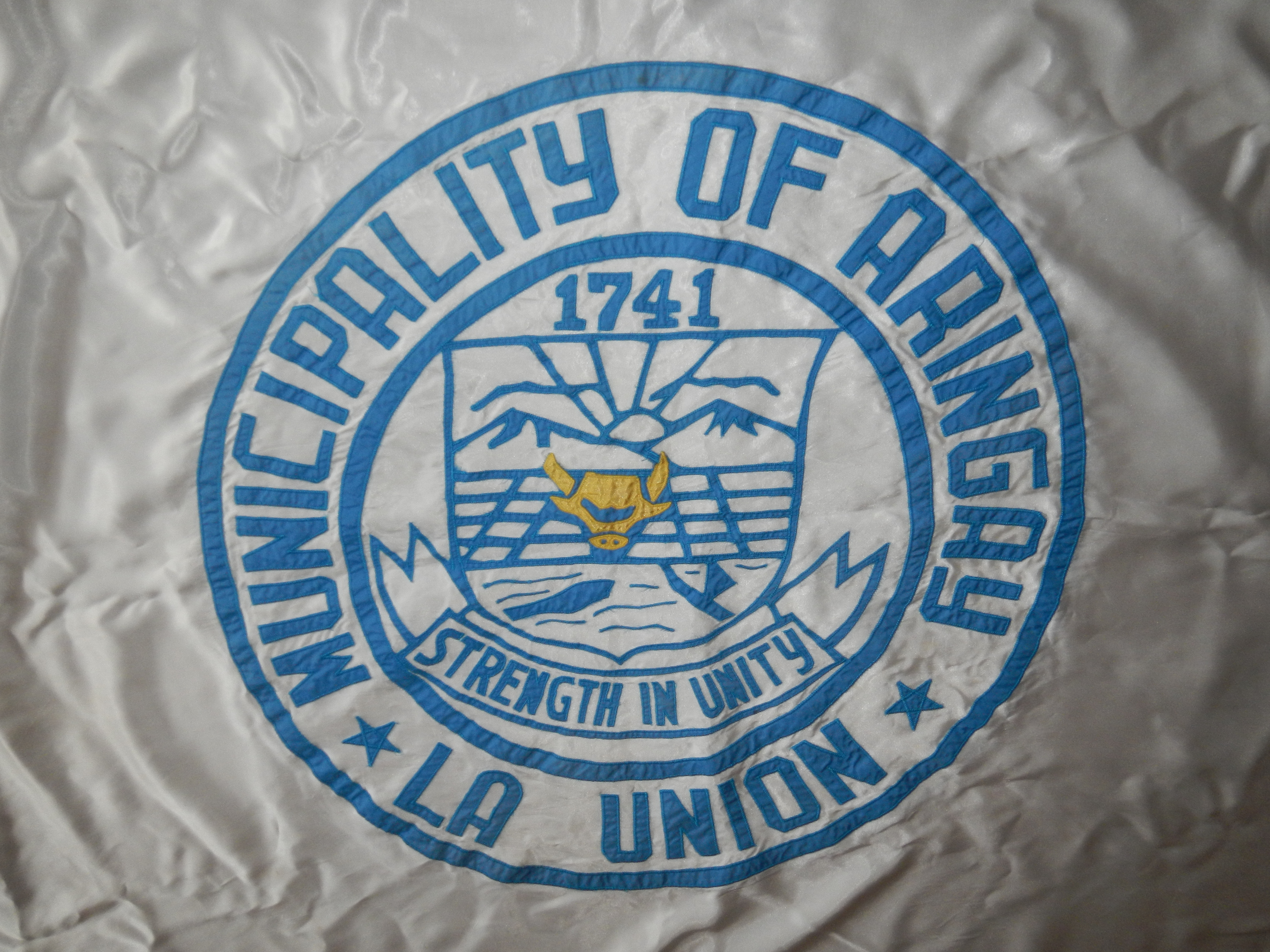
- Flag Seal

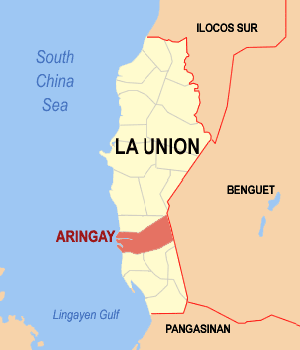
- Map of La Union with Aringay highlighted
- Interactive map of Aringay
- Location within the Philippines
- Coordinates: 16°23′54″N 120°21′20″E
- Country: Philippines
- Region: Ilocos Region
- Province: La Union
- District: 2nd district
- Founded: 1641
- Barangays: 24 (see Barangays)

Government
  - Type: Sangguniang Bayan
  - Mayor: Eric O. Sibuma
  - Vice Mayor: Benjamin O. Sibuma
  - Representative: Dante S. Garcia
  - Municipal Council: Members: Maria Isabel D. Diaz; Ramsey Pascual D. Mangaoang; Woodrow P. Araojo Jr.; Rachell Juloya-Martinez; Josephine M. Dacanay; Karl Adrielle Dave G. Ong; Nelda B. Mapile; Rolando M. Herrera
  - Electorate: 33,420 voters (2025)

Area
  - Total: 84.54 km^{2} (32.64 sq mi)
- Elevation: 38 m (125 ft)
- Highest elevation: 299 m (981 ft)
- Lowest elevation: 0 m (0 ft)

Population (2024 census)
  - Total: 50,786
  - Density: 600.7/km^{2} (1,556/sq mi)
  - Households: 12,237

Economy
  - Income class: 1st municipal income class
  - Poverty incidence: 10.85% (2023)
  - Revenue: ▲PHP 241,735,653.59 million (87%) (2018)
  - Assets: ▲PHP 397,480,131.29 million (40.7%) (2018)
  - Expenditure: ▲PHP 135,407,903.62 million (18.7%) (2018)
  - Liabilities: ₱ 151.4 million (2024)

Service provider
  - Electricity: La Union Electric Cooperative (LUELCO)
- Time zone: UTC+8 (PST)
- ZIP code: 2503
- PSGC: 0103302000
- IDD : area code: +63 (0)72
- Native languages: Ilocano; Pangasinan; Tagalog
- Website: www.aringay.gov.ph

Aringay, officially the Municipality of Aringay (Ilocano: Ili ti Aringay; Pangasinan: Baley na Aringay; Filipino: Bayan ng Aringay), is a coastal municipality in the province of La Union, Philippines. According to the 2024 census, it has a population of 50,786 people.

Known in Philippine History as the birthplace of revolutionary leader Diego Silang, its economy is based primarily on agriculture - producing rice, tobacco and fruit crops as economic staples. A nascent tourism industry is centered on its beach resorts. Its ethnic population is predominantly Ilocano and Christian (Roman Catholic).

== Etymology ==
The name "Aringay" is attributed to two main theories.

The first theory suggests that the name originated from an early settlement known as Alingay, Alinguey, or Aringuey, which thrived through gold trading along the coastal areas and the Aringay River during the 15th-16th century.

The second theory is rooted in local legend. In the early 16th century, two rival settlements existed on opposite sides of a river, each led by a chieftain. Aring, the daughter of the southern chieftain, and Ayong, the son of the northern chieftain, fell in love despite the disputes between their families.

The lovers met secretly at the river, and during one fateful meeting, Aring’s boat capsized during a storm. Ayong heroically saved her, shouting “Aring-ay!” as he did. This event led to the reconciliation of their families, the union of their settlements, and the naming of the town Aringay in honor of their story.

== History ==
=== Early history ===
In its early history, the town now known as Aringay was referred to as Alingay, Alinguey, or Aringuey. It was a settlement of Pangasinan people strategically located along its coastal areas, lowlands, and the banks of the Aringay River. Historically, this settlement formed part of the northern section of the ancient Pangasinan region.

Aringay played a pivotal role as a coastal maritime trading center, serving as the terminus of the Aringay-Tonglo-Balatok gold trail. This route linked the gold mines of upland Tonglo (in present-day Benguet) to lowland Aringay, facilitating the transport of gold through the nearby port-settlement of Aroo (modern-day Agoo).

The settlement flourished through trade with neighboring groups such as the Samtoy (Ilocano) communities to the north and Cordilleran (Igorot) peoples like the Ibaloi, Ifugao, and Kankanaey in the highlands of the Cordillera Central. Aringay also hosted foreign traders from China, mainly from Fujian, Japan, and Maritime Southeast Asia, fostering a vibrant trade network. Goods exchanged in these transactions included porcelain, silk, cotton, beeswax, gemstones, beads, and precious minerals, particularly gold, which was highly valued both regionally and internationally.

=== Spanish Colonization ===
In June 1572, Spanish conquistador Juan de Salcedo and his soldiers arrived in Aringay during their expedition to Northern Luzon. Following the pacification of the nearby settlement of Aroo, they encountered a thriving enclave of ethnic Pangasinan people actively involved in gold trading.

The Spanish attempted to persuade the locals to pay tribute to the Crown and convert to Christianity. However, Salcedo did not establish a permanent foothold in the area, opting instead to continue his expedition northward to Vigan, which he later founded as Villa Fernandina de Vigan in honor of Prince Ferdinand, son of King Philip II.

Subsequently, Augustinian friars and Spanish authorities, led by Captain Alfonso Quirante, formally organized the settlement into a pueblo. The Spaniards imposed their authority by subjugating the locals and foreign merchants and converting them to Christianity. A visita (satellite mission station) was established in Aringay and placed under the jurisdiction of the larger church district in Agoo. New agricultural techniques and the Encomienda System were introduced, entrusting native labor and resources to Spanish encomenderos, friars, and local elites in exchange for tribute and governance.

The gold trade in Aringay eventually declined as Spanish authorities centralized the precious metals industry. This shift disrupted the community’s traditional way of life and reoriented its economy toward agriculture under Spanish influence.

By the 18th century, population pressures and the oppressive conditions imposed by Spanish colonial rule prompted Ilocano migrants from the Ilocos provinces and neighboring towns to settle in Aringay. These settlers established communities along the mouth of the Carayan Lucsin (Aringay River), dividing into settlements on the river's northern and southern banks. Over time, they eventually expanded eastward, forming prosperous villages in the surrounding valleys. The migration resulted in Aringay becoming predominantly inhabited by Ilocanos and Ilocanized Pangasinenses.

On December 16, 1741, the settlement was officially organized as a municipality and named Aringay. Don Pablo Vergara served as the first gobernadorcillo under the jurisdiction of Pangasinan and the Bishopric of Nueva Segovia. Following Spanish urban planning principles, early homes were constructed in a Renaissance grid pattern.

Under Spanish rule, Aringay thrived, with agriculture becoming the primary livelihood. The introduction of modern farming techniques improved productivity in the valleys and plains, while the fishing industry - supported by species like giant carp introduced by East Asian traders - flourished. A Chinese community also developed in the town, contributing significantly to the local economy.

==== Creation of La Union ====
On October 29, 1849, Governor-General Narciso Clavería issued a decree merging eight towns from Pangasinan, three from Ilocos Sur, and territories in the Cordillera to form the province of La Union. The establishment of the province was formalized on March 2, 1850, through the Superior Decreto signed by Governor-General Antonio María Blanco.

Aringay was one of the founding towns, alongside San Fernando (the provincial capital), Agoo, Santo Tomas, Rosario, Tubao, Caba, Naguilian, Bauang, San Juan, Balaoan, Luna, Bangar, and Bacnotan. This formation was confirmed on April 18, 1854, by a royal decree (real orden) from Queen Isabella II of Spain.

The towns of Caba and Gallano (later placed in the province of Benguet and then abolished in 1900) were later carved out of Aringay's northern borders.

==== Philippine Revolution ====
During the Philippine Revolution, the residents of Aringay actively participated in the fight for independence against Spanish colonial rule. Under the leadership of General Manuel Tinio, a close ally of Emilio Aguinaldo, the locals engaged in significant resistance efforts in Northern Luzon.

On June 16, 1898, a fierce battle took place in the town plaza, where 96 Katipuneros died. After months of resistance, Aringay was finally liberated from Spanish control, contributing to the Philippines’ eventual declaration of independence in 1898.

=== American Colonization ===
The independence of the Philippines from Spain was short-lived, as the Philippine–American War soon followed. In 1899, Aringay became a center of resistance against American forces. Guerrilla Unit No. 5, under the leadership of Captain Fontanilla, operated in Aringay and its neighboring areas, including Agoo, Tubao, Santo Tomas, and Rosario. The guerrilla forces played a crucial role in resisting American advances and defending the town's autonomy. On November 20, 1899, American troops arrived in La Union, leading to a decisive battle at the Aringay River, where the guerrillas inflicted significant damage on the U.S. forces.

By 1901, La Union, including Aringay, was fully under American control. During this period, the Americans continued a railway project initially started by the Spanish colonizers. The Ferrocarril de Manila-Dagupan, which aimed to stimulate economic growth in the countryside and reduce demands for independence, was renamed the Manila Railroad Company under American management. The railway line reached Aringay in 1912.

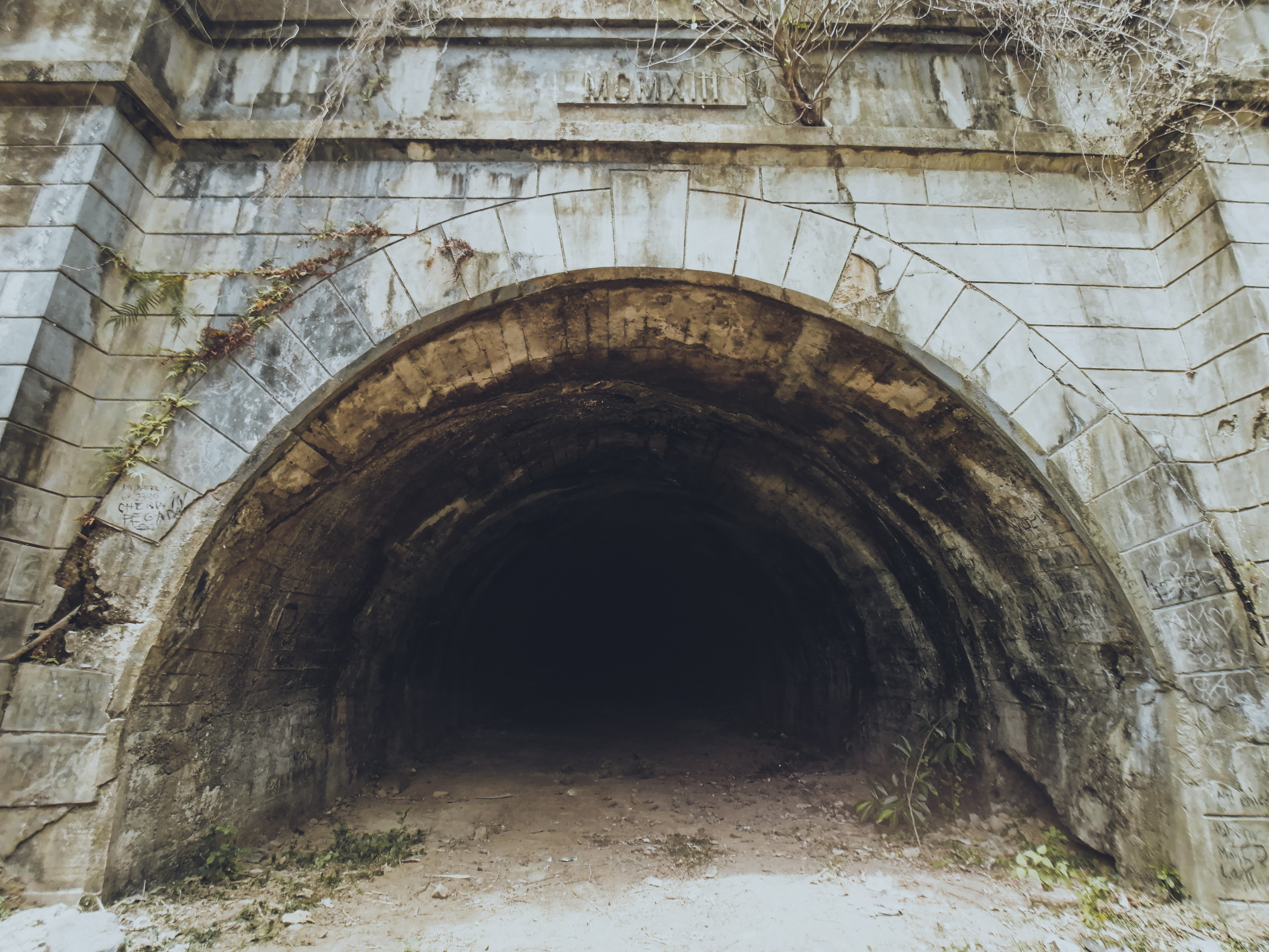
Aringay abandoned railway tunnel

Efforts to extend the railway from Aringay to Baguio began shortly thereafter, with the Aringay segment completed in 1913. However, the project was abandoned due to financial constraints faced by the Manila Railroad Company. The tunnel constructed in Aringay remains as a historical landmark, having stood for over 105 years. Additionally, a railway bridge connecting Sta. Rita West and Poblacion in Aringay was built as part of the Manila-to-San Fernando, La Union line.

By the 1910s, the American colonial government introduced several public services in the area. A public education system was established, with American teachers known as Thomasites sent to assimilate Filipinos into American culture. Public hospitals were also built, and a local governance system was introduced, allowing Filipinos to elect their own leaders for the first time. These developments marked significant changes in Aringay’s social, educational, and political landscape during the American occupation.

=== Japanese Occupation ===
In December 1941, Japanese forces attacked U.S. military installations and residential areas in Aringay. By December 22, 1941, the Japanese 14th Army, commanded by Lieutenant General Masaharu Homma, landed at the mouth of Aringay River after securing San Fernando and Bacnotan as part of their strategy to secure the Lingayen Gulf and advance their occupation of the Philippines. This event marked the beginning of the Japanese occupation in Aringay.

During this period, the town faced strict control under the Imperial Japanese government, leading to widespread abuses, including torture, sexual slavery, and massacres of local residents. These atrocities left a lasting impact on the community and the region as a whole.

By January 1945, American forces launched a successful campaign in the Battle of Lingayen Gulf, which marked the turning point in liberating northern Luzon from Japanese control. Aringay was officially freed in March 1945 following the Battle of Bacsil Ridge in San Fernando, which signified the full liberation of the province from Japanese occupation.

=== Failed proposed merger with Agoo ===
In 2014, La Union Second District Representative Eufranio Eriguel filed House Bill 4644, which seeks to merge the municipalities of Agoo and Aringay into a component city to be known as the City of Agoo-Aringay, which would have created new positions for which the former municipal officials could run despite having the terms limits of their offices. This sparked protests from the people of both municipalities, who did not want the merger because it would subject Aringay citizens to the same high local taxes as Agoo, and because of concerns that Agoo and Aringay would lose their cultural identities. The proposed merger thus did not push through within term of the 16th Congress. Later it was pushed again within the term of 20th congress.

== Geography ==
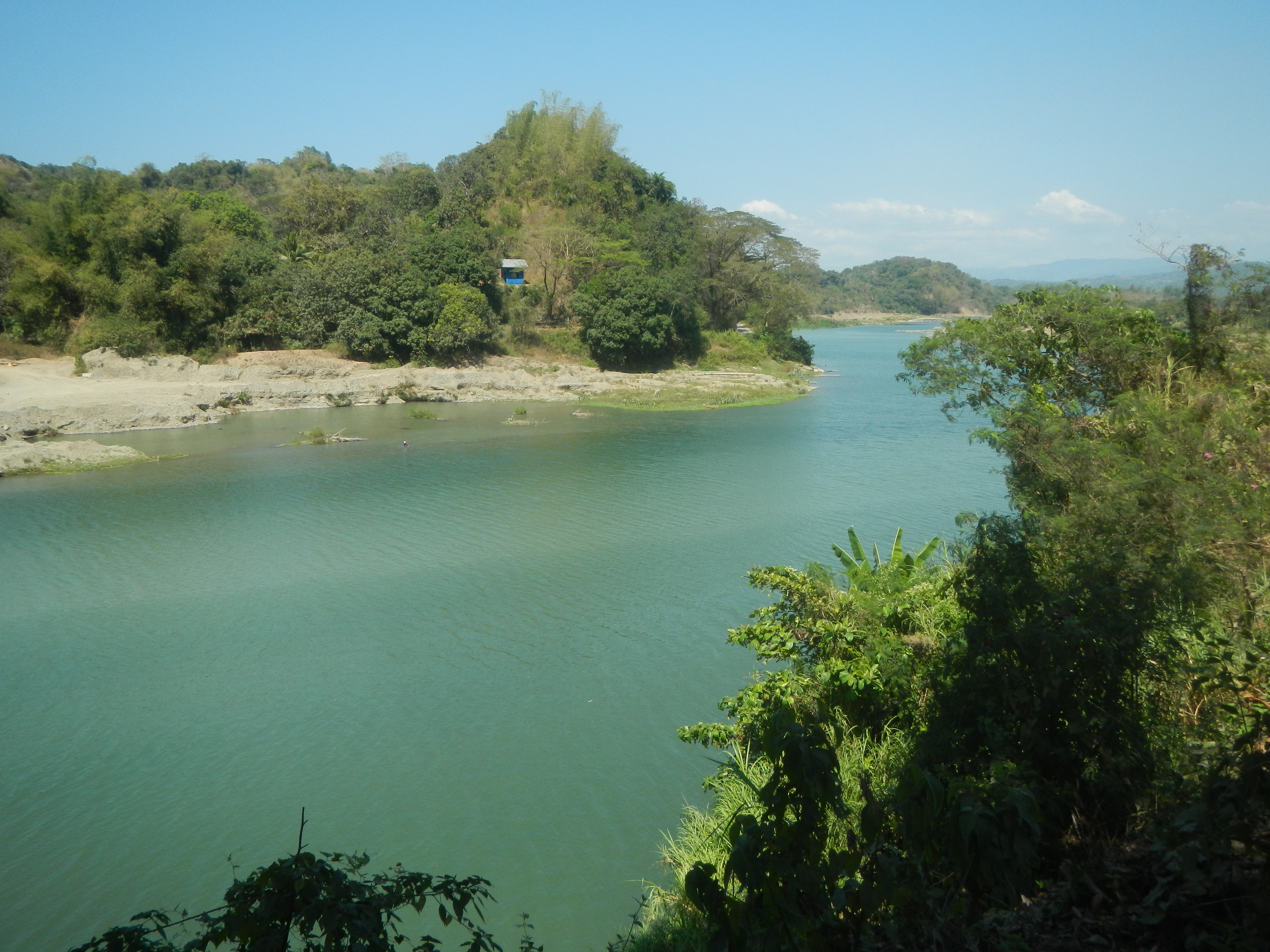
Aringay River in San Rita

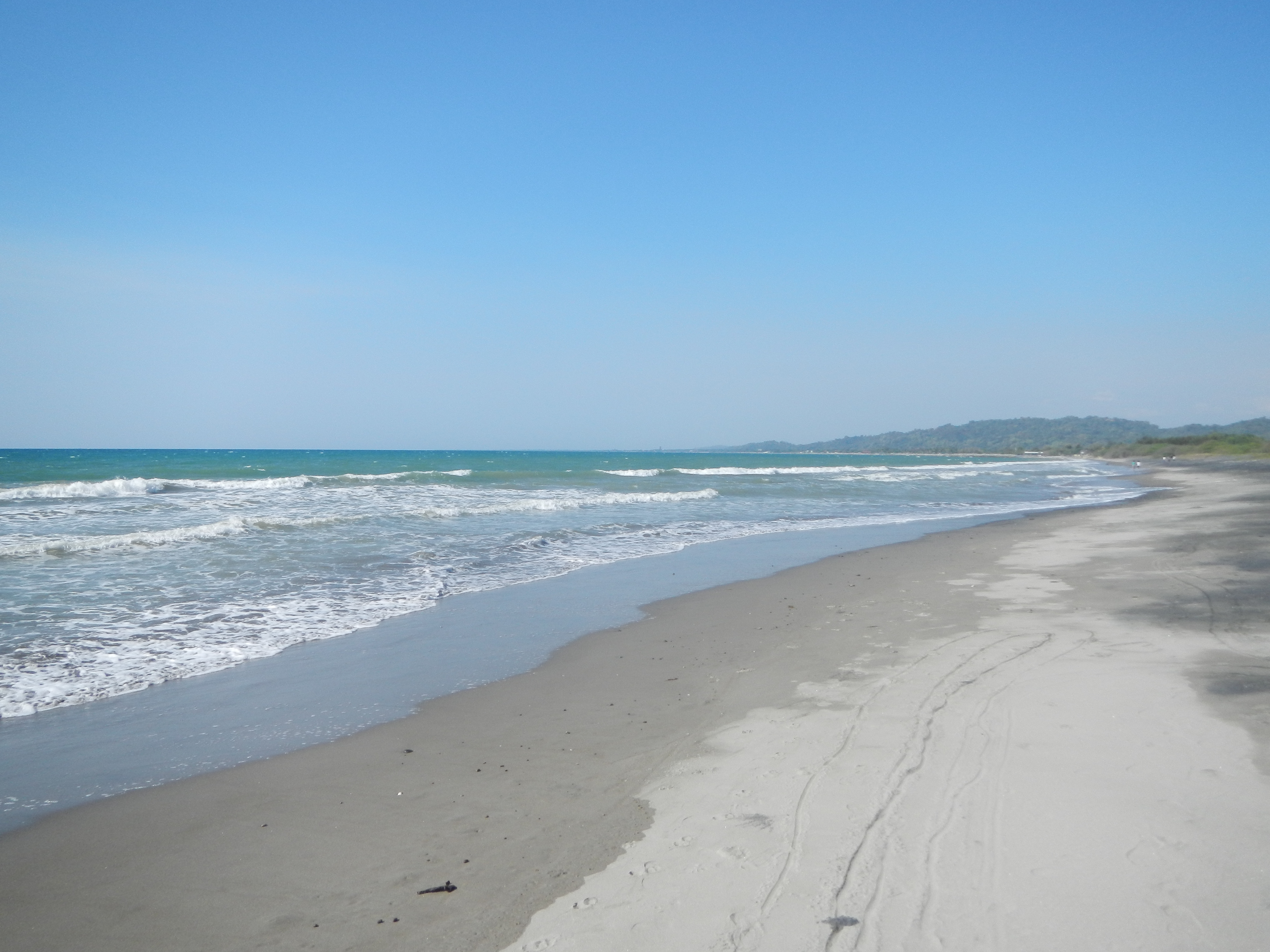
Coastal area in Samara

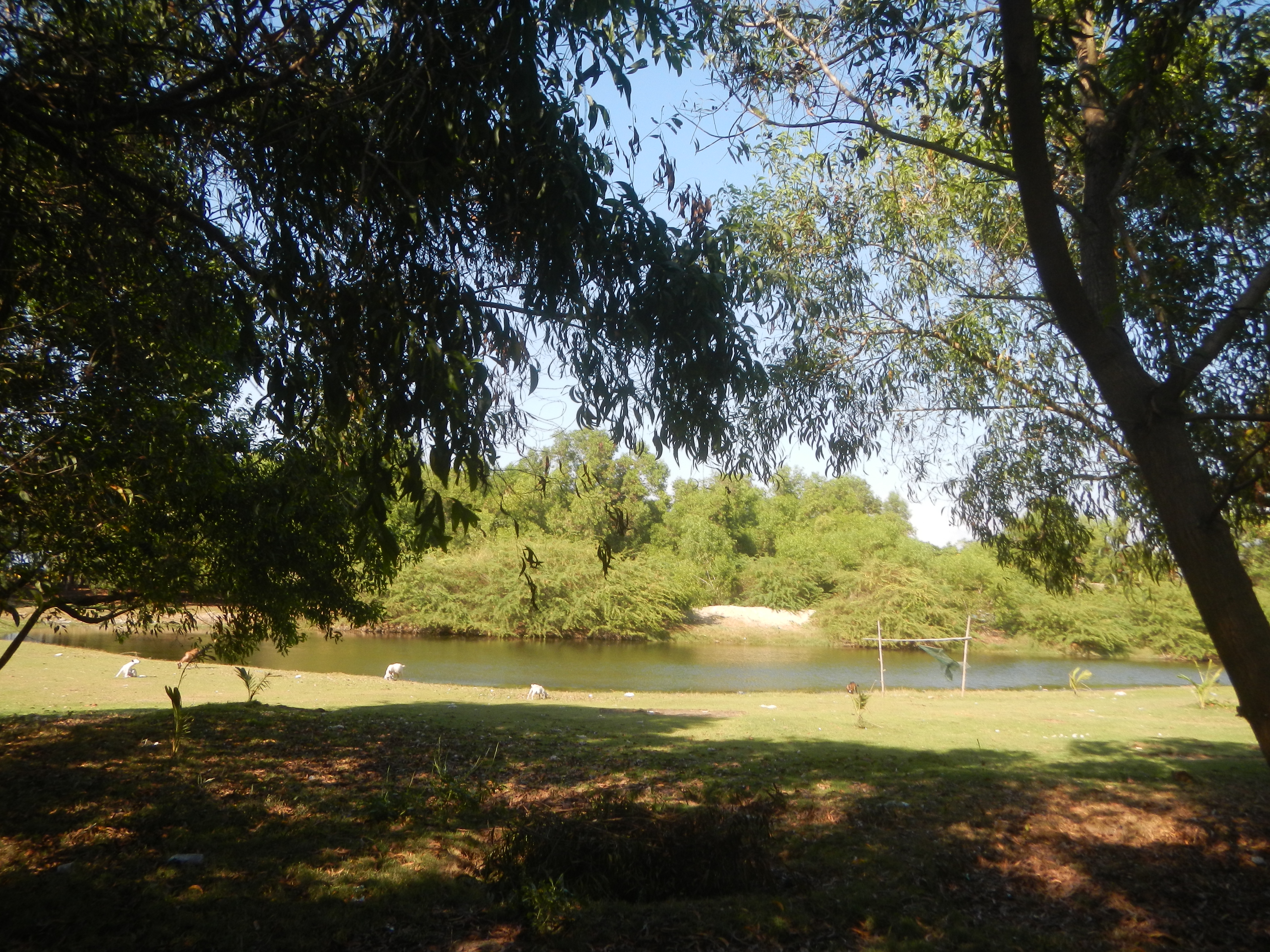
Creek in Samara

Aringay is a coastal municipality in La Union with a land area of 84.54 square kilometers (32.64 square miles), comprising 5.64% of La Union's total area. The municipality's topography features hilly and mountainous terrains that rise gradually eastward from the coastal plains. Situated at the foothills of the Cordillera Central, it is home to Salapac Mountain and Mt. Bubon Posi, one of its highest peaks at approximately 325 meters above sea level, visible from multiple vantage points across the town. The area is rich in indigenous trees, natural springs, and the Aringay watershed, a vital resource for the community.

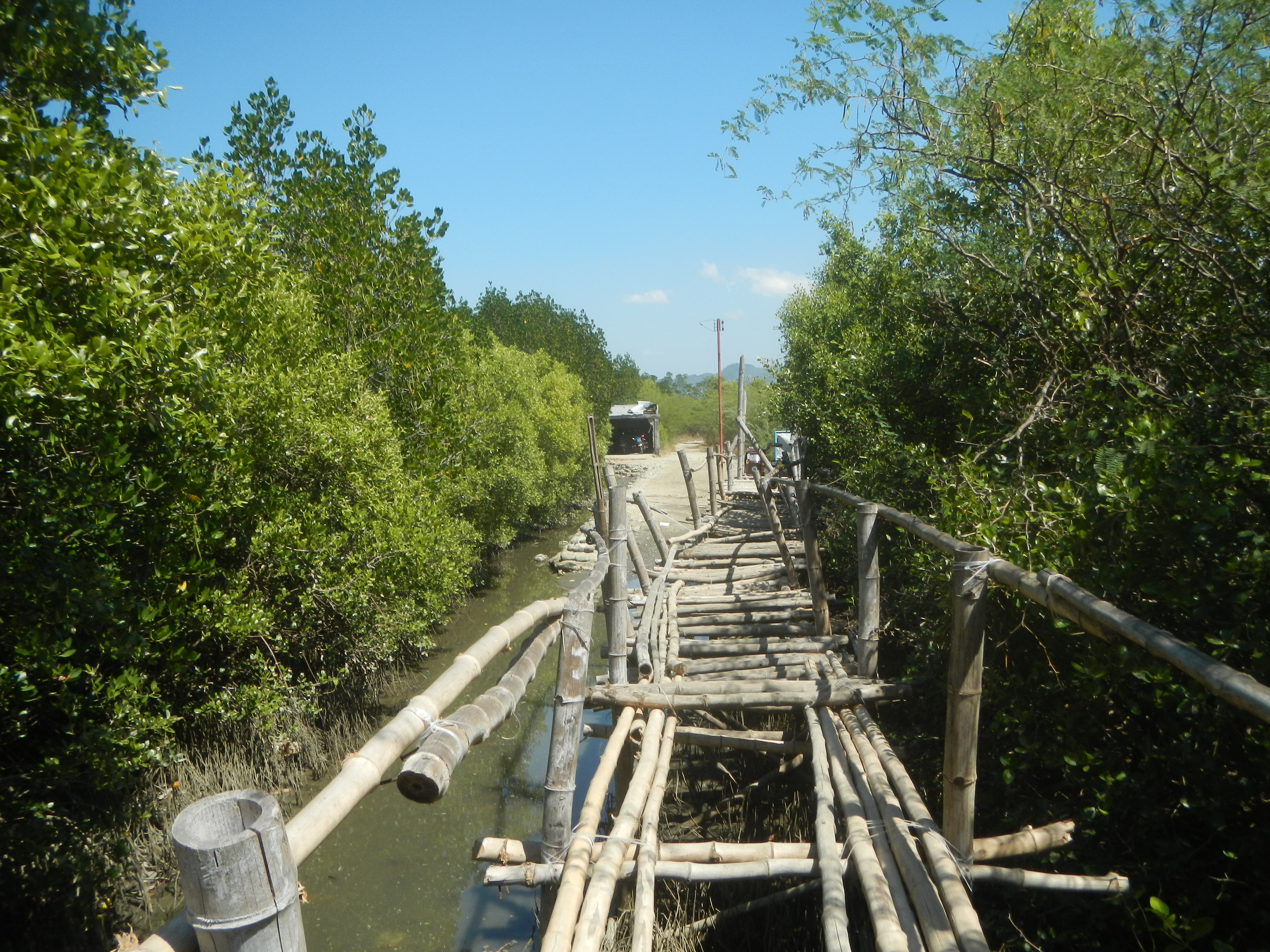
Mangroves in Alaska

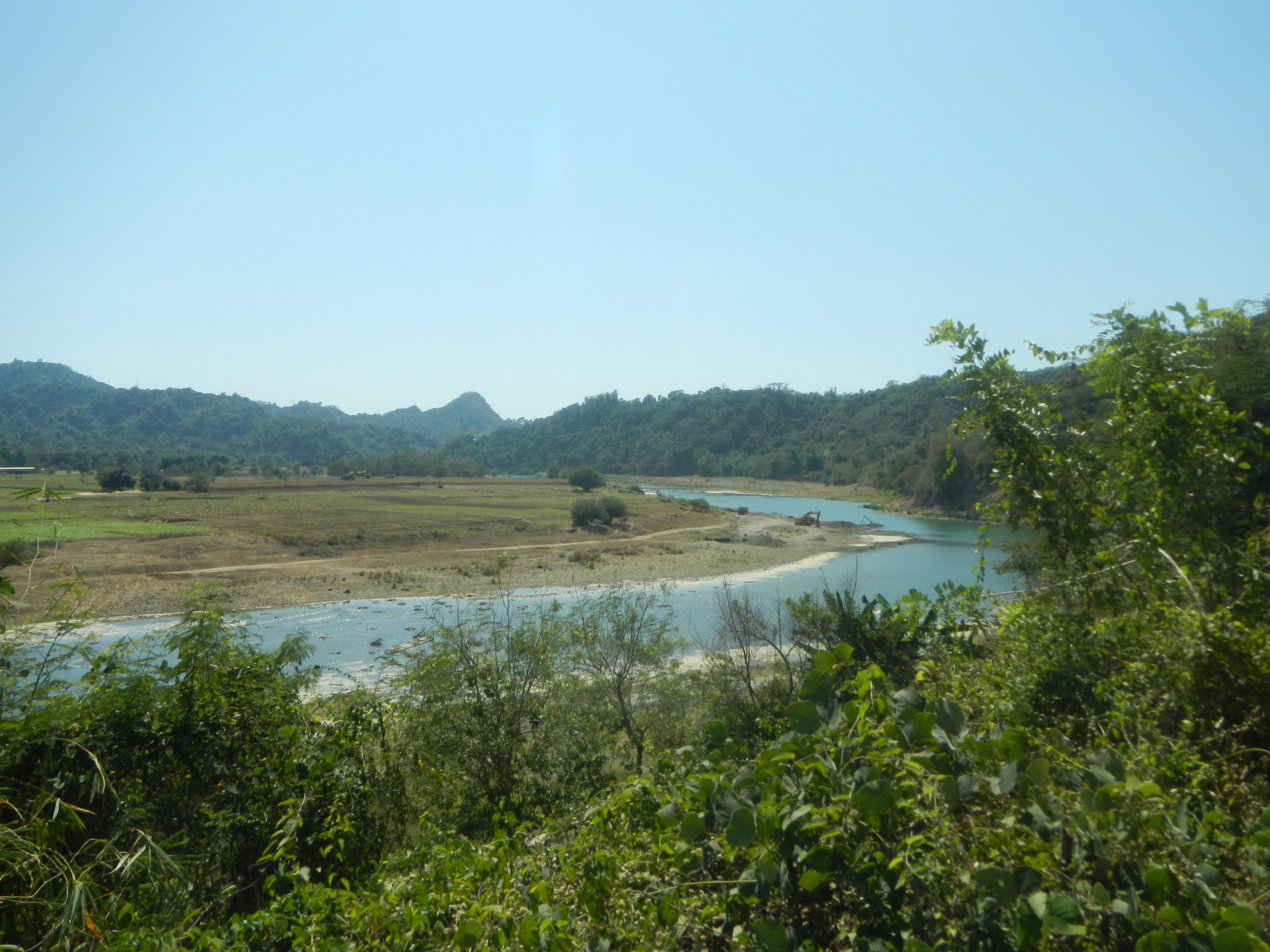
Aringay River in San Juan West

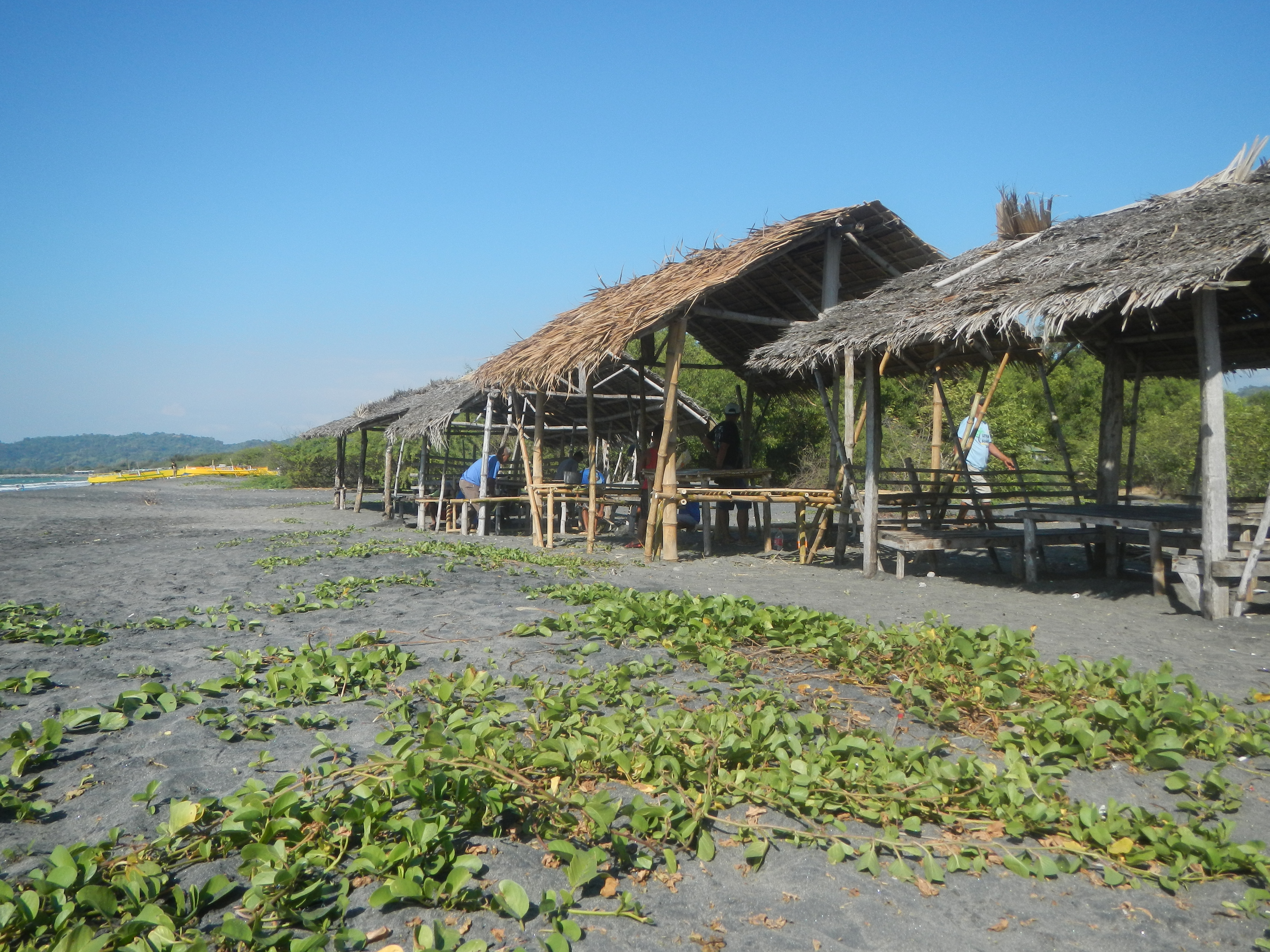
Aringay Beach

Aringay is traversed by several creeks and rivers, the largest being the Aringay River, which flows into the Lingayen Gulf. The Aringay River watershed is a significant river basin in southern La Union, spanning 45 kilometers in length with a drainage area of 469 square kilometers. It is classified as a Class B River Basin, suitable for primary contact activities such as swimming, bathing, and skin diving. It also has a drainage area of 469sqm. Apart from La Union, it also caters to the Province of Benguet. The river runs along the Aringay fault line, which can produce rumbling sounds during seismic activity caused by movements in the fault.

The municipality is bordered by the Lingayen Gulf and the South China Sea to the west, providing access to coastal resources and contributing to its strategic geographical location. Aringay shares its borders with several municipalities, including Caba to the north, Agoo to the southwest, Tubao to the southeast, and Sablan and Tuba in Benguet to the east.

Aringay is situated 26.34 kilometres (16.37 mi) from the provincial capital San Fernando, and 240.78 kilometres (149.61 mi) from the country's capital city of Manila.

=== Barangays ===
Aringay is politically subdivided into 24 barangays with upland and lowland barangays. Each barangay consists of puroks and some have sitios.

- Alaska
- Basca
- Dulao
- Gallano
- Macabato
- Manga
- Pangao-aoan East
- Pangao-aoan West
- Poblacion
- Samara
- San Antonio
- San Benito Norte
- San Benito Sur
- San Eugenio
- San Juan East
- San Juan West
- San Simon East
- San Simon West
- Santa Cecilia
- Santa Lucia
- Santa Rita East
- Santa Rita West
- Santo Rosario East
- Santo Rosario West

=== Climate ===
The town experiences the prevailing monsoon climate of Northern Luzon, characterized by a dry season from November to April and a wet season from May to October.

Climate data for Aringay, La Union
Month	Jan	Feb	Mar	Apr	May	Jun	Jul	Aug	Sep	Oct	Nov	Dec	Year
Mean daily maximum °C (°F)	30 (86)	31 (88)	33 (91)	34 (93)	33 (91)	31 (88)	30 (86)	29 (84)	30 (86)	31 (88)	31 (88)	31 (88)	31 (88)
Mean daily minimum °C (°F)	20 (68)	21 (70)	22 (72)	24 (75)	25 (77)	25 (77)	25 (77)	25 (77)	24 (75)	23 (73)	22 (72)	21 (70)	23 (74)
Average precipitation mm (inches)	15 (0.6)	16 (0.6)	24 (0.9)	33 (1.3)	102 (4.0)	121 (4.8)	177 (7.0)	165 (6.5)	144 (5.7)	170 (6.7)	56 (2.2)	23 (0.9)	1,046 (41.2)
Average rainy days	6.3	6.6	9.5	12.8	20.6	23.5	25.4	23.4	23.2	21.4	14.0	8.2	194.9
Source: Meteoblue

== Demographics ==
Population census of Aringay
Year	Pop.	±% p.a.
1903	8,572	—
1918	11,247	+1.83%
1939	12,487	+0.50%
1948	13,079	+0.52%
1960	17,572	+2.49%
1970	21,835	+2.19%
1975	25,042	+2.79%
1980	27,524	+1.91%
1990	33,258	+1.91%
1995	36,743	+1.88%
2000	41,422	+2.60%
2007	43,438	+0.66%
2010	44,949	+1.25%
2015	47,458	+1.04%
2020	50,380	+1.27%
2024	50,786	+0.19%
Source: Philippine Statistics Authority

Based on the 2020 Philippine Statistics Authority Census of Population and Housing (2020 CPH), the municipality of Aringay, La Union recorded a total population of 50,380 persons as of May 1, 2020. This figure showed an increase of 2,922 persons compared to the total population of 47,458 persons in the 2015 Census of Population. The population growth in the municipality of Aringay, La Union from 2015 to 2020 translated to an average annual population growth rate (PGR) of 1.26%, which means that about 13 persons were added annually for every 1,000 individuals in the population.

Among the 24 barangays of Aringay, San Eugenio was the most populous, constituting 8.28% of the total municipal population. San Benito Sur was the second most populous barangay with a 7.40% share, followed by Dulao (7.23%), Santa Rita West (7.23%), and Poblacion (6.96%). The least populated barangay in the municipality was San Juan East, which accounted for 1.99% of the population.

The number of households in Aringay, La Union increased from 10,817 households in 2015 to 12,237 households in 2020. The average household size decreased from 4.4 persons in 2015 to 4.1 persons in 2020.

=== Gender ===
In 2020, the household population of Aringay totaled 50,379 persons, with males accounting for 50.31% and females comprising 49.69% of the population. These figures resulted in a sex ratio of 101 males for every 100 females, which is a decrease from the sex ratio of 105 males for every 100 females recorded in 2015. Among children aged below 15 years, the sex ratio was 106 males per 100 females, while among those aged 15 to 64 years, the sex ratio was 103 males per 100 females. For individuals aged 65 years and over, the sex ratio was 72 males per 100 females. The median age of the household population in Aringay, La Union in 2020 was 27.60 years, which indicates that half of the population was younger than 27.60 years. This median age was higher than the 26.18 years recorded in 2015.

=== Dependency and Marital Status ===
The young dependents (0 to 14 years) accounted for 28.01% of the population in 2020, while the old dependents (65 years and older) made up 7.38%. The working-age population (15 to 64 years) constituted 64.61% of the total population. The overall dependency ratio in 2020 was 54 dependents per 100 working-age individuals, which is lower than the dependency ratio of 57 dependents per 100 working-age individuals recorded in 2015. Among the household population aged 10 years old and over, 37.67% were never married, while 42.49% were married. Other marital statuses included 5.30% widowed, 1.81% annulled or separated, and 12.71% living in common-law or live-in arrangements. Among the never-married population, 54.39% were males, while 45.61% were females.

=== Urban and Rural Distribution ===
In 2020, 18.00% of the population (9,070 persons) lived in urban barangays, which represents an increase of 1,738 persons compared to the 7,332 urban residents recorded in 2015. The rural population accounted for 82.00% (41,310 persons) of the total population. This comprehensive demographic profile provides insights into the population, gender distribution, education, religion, language, and household dynamics of Aringay, La Union.

=== Religion ===
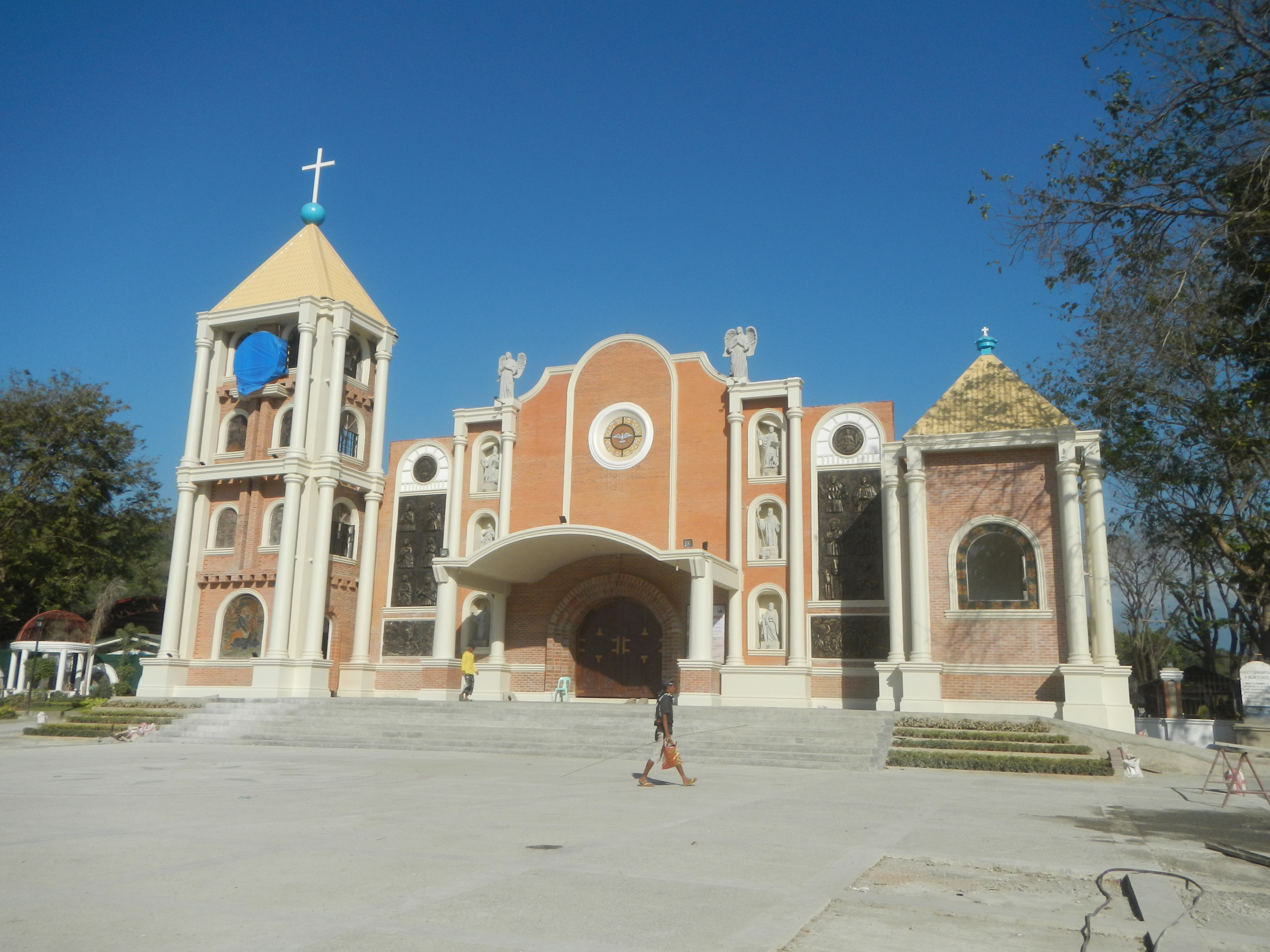
Saint Lucy Parish Church of Aringay

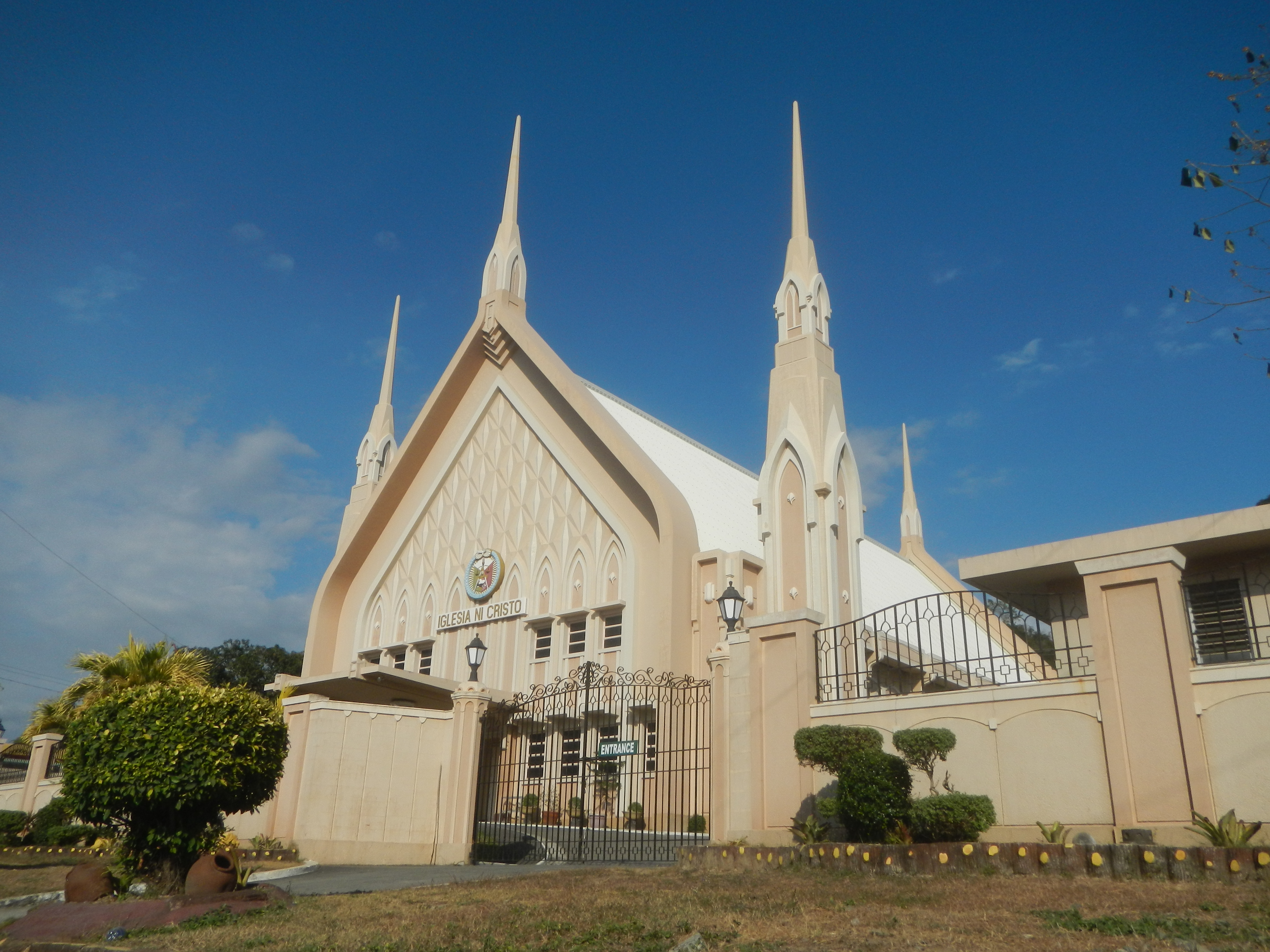
Local ng Aringay, Iglesia ni Cristo

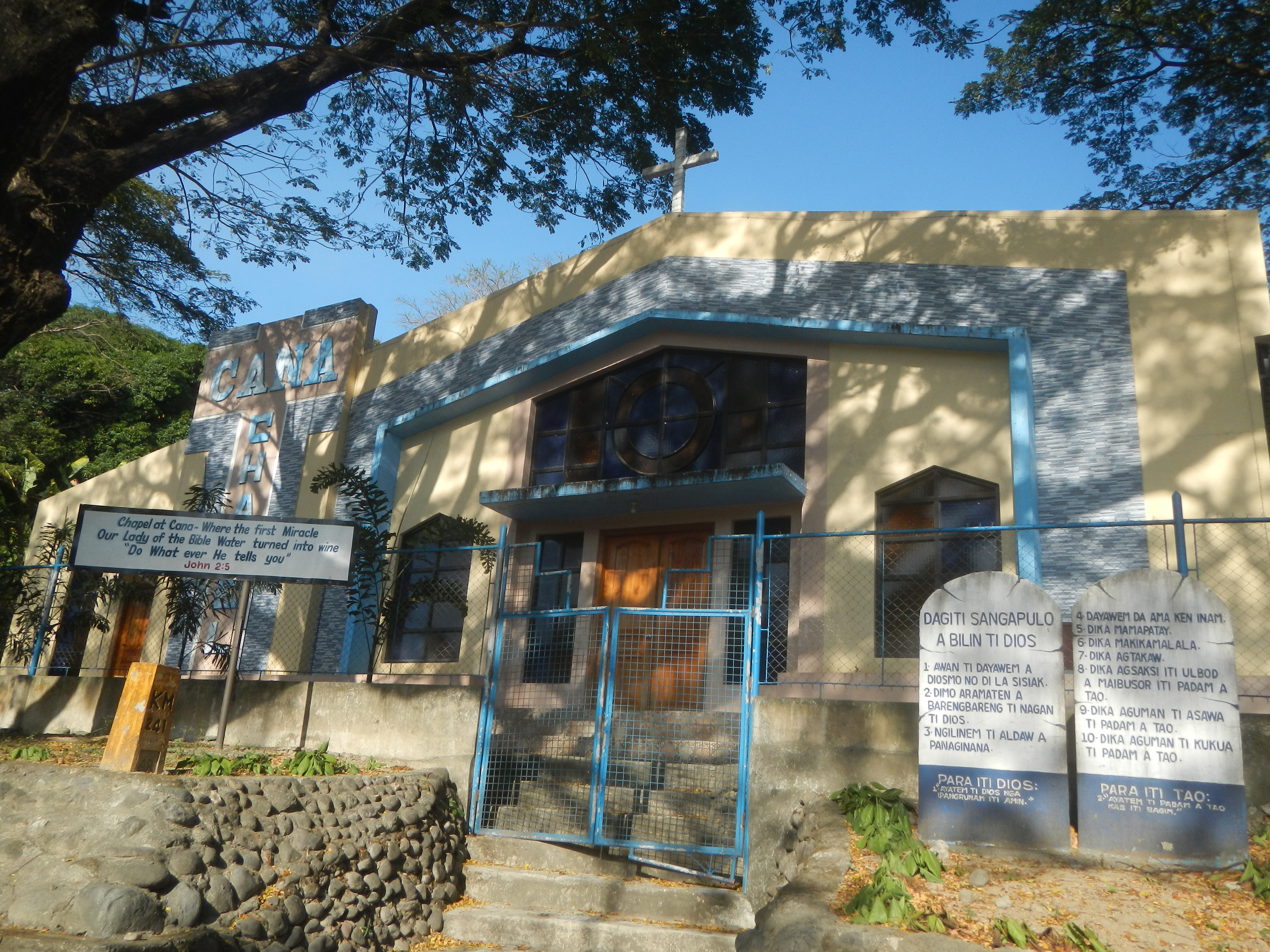
Cana Chapel - Bible Land

The population of Aringay, La Union is predominantly Roman Catholic, but other Christian denominations, such as Iglesia ni Cristo, Protestant groups, Aglipayan and Jehovah's Witnesses, are also present. Smaller religious communities practicing Islam and Buddhism are also found in the municipality.

=== Language ===
The primary language spoken in Aringay, La Union is Iloco, with Filipino and English commonly used in government and business. The majority of the population in Aringay identifies as Ilocano, while smaller indigenous groups such as the Ibaloi, Bago, and Kankanaey are present in the upland areas. English is widely used as the medium of instruction in schools.

== Education ==
The Aringay Schools District Office governs all educational institutions within the municipality. It oversees the management and operations of all private and public elementary and high schools.

The literacy rate of Aringay, La Union in 2020 was 98.98%, with 50.34% of literate individuals being males and 49.66% being females. Among the total household population aged 5 years old and over, 28.96% attended or completed elementary education, 41.68% reached or finished high school, 8.16% were college undergraduates, and 13.04% attained academic degrees. Among those with academic degrees, 57.79% were females, while 42.21% were males. Similarly, 65.38% of post-baccalaureate degree holders were females. The municipality has 22 public elementary schools and 3 public secondary schools providing education to children and young adults in the area.

=== Primary and elementary schools ===
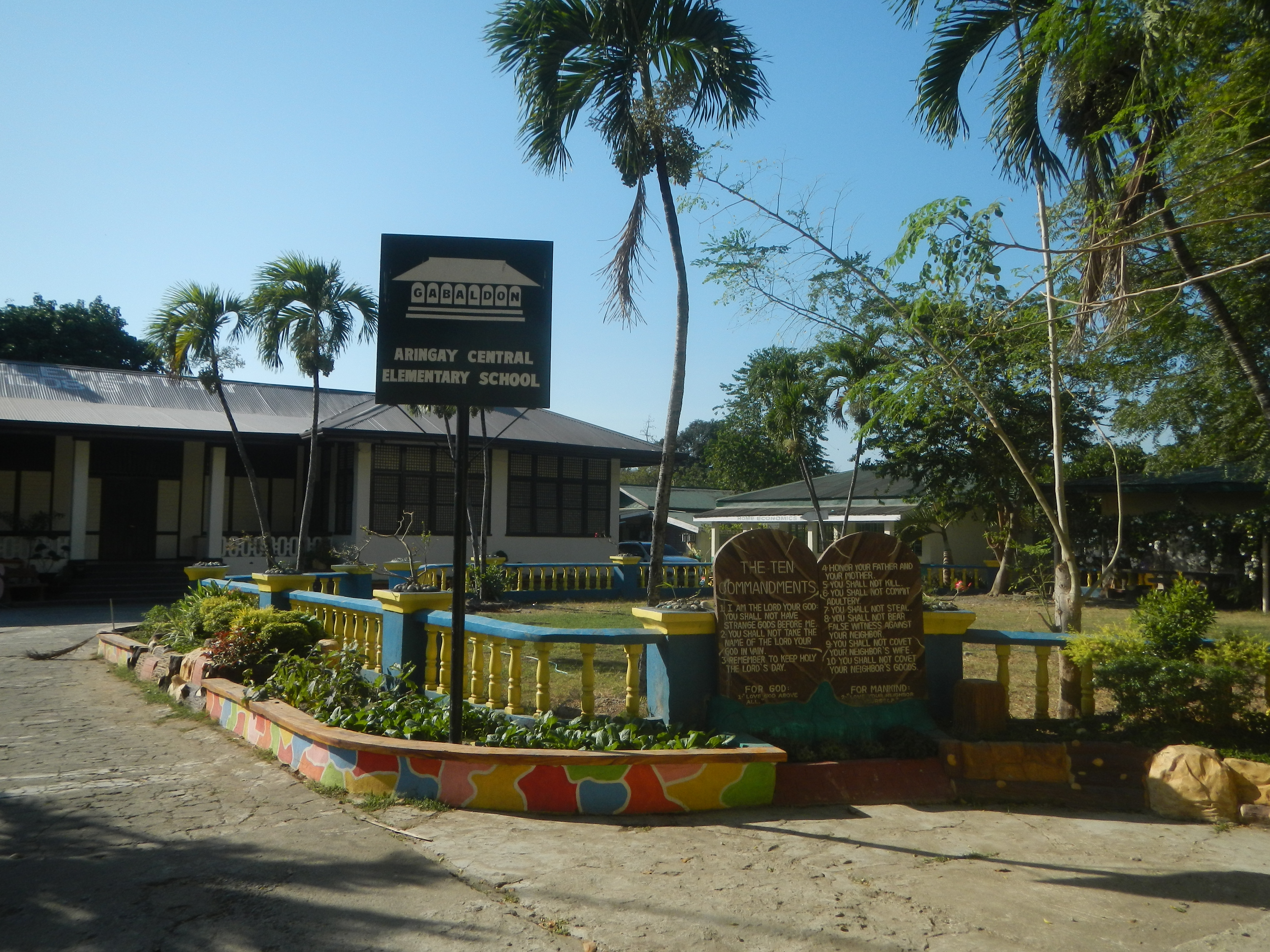
Aringay Central Elementary School

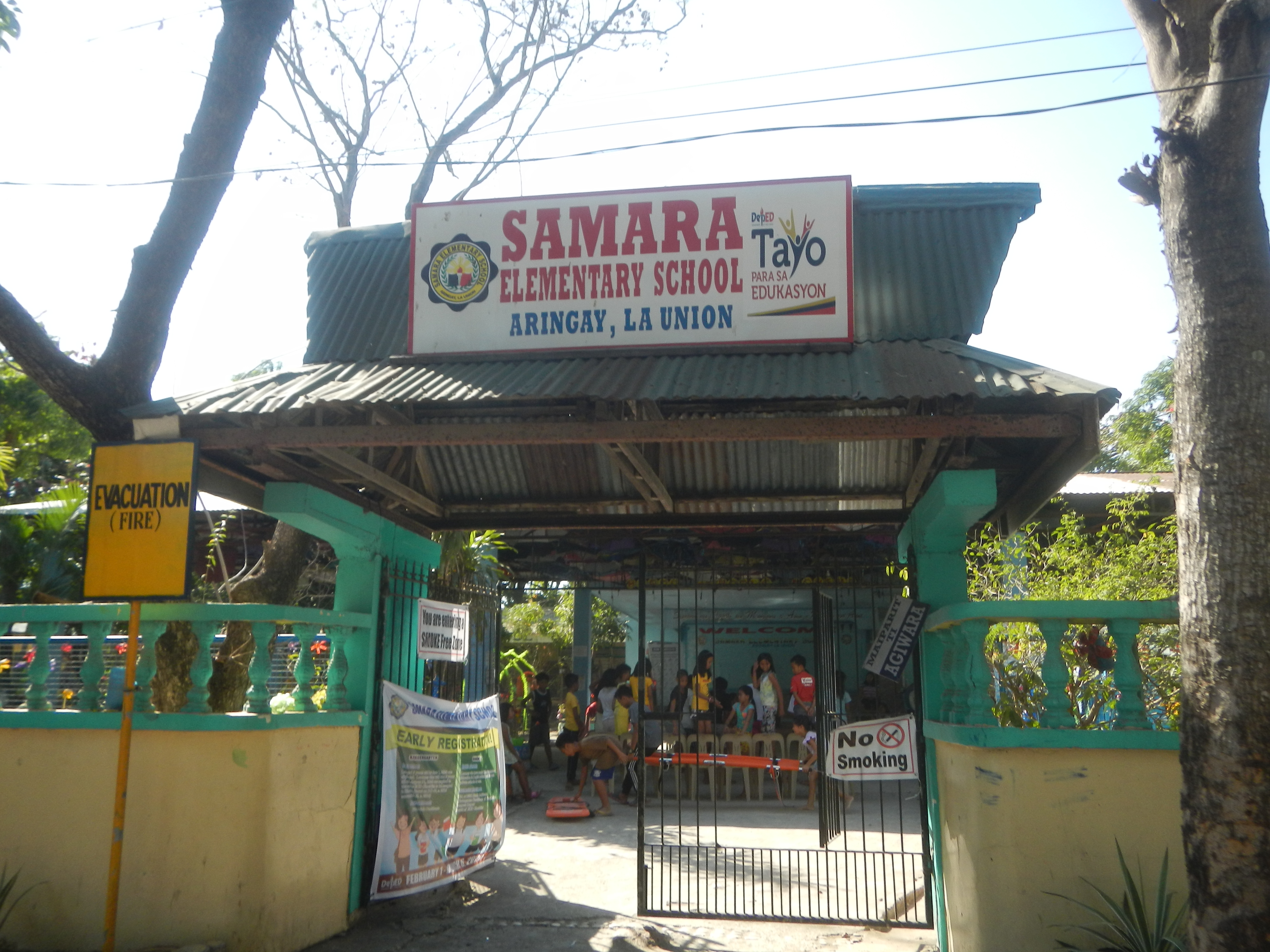
Samara Elementary School

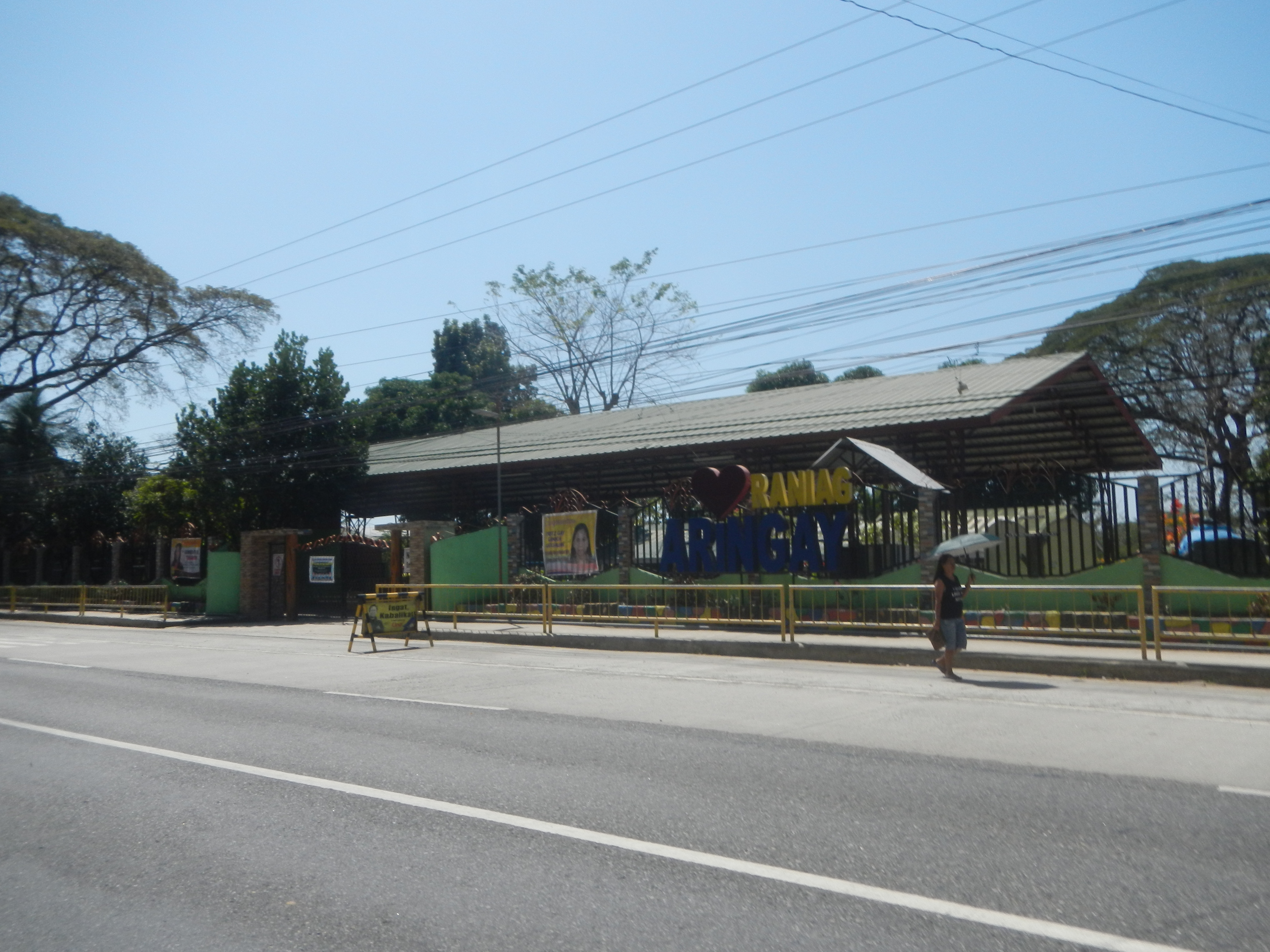
San Eugenio Elementary School

- Aringay Central Elementary School
- Basca Elementary School
- Bitag Elementary School
- Bulalacao Elementary School
- Camusing Elementary School
- Gallano Elementary School
- Immalog Elementary School
- Macabato Elementary School
- Manga Elementary School
- New Bern (Alaska) Elementary School
- Pangao-aoan East Elementary School
- Pangao-aoan West Elementary School
- Samara Elementary School
- San Antonio Elementary School
- San Benito Elementary School
- San Eugenio Elementary School
- San Juan Elementary School
- San Simon Elementary School
- Sta. Cecilia Elementary School
- Sta. Lucia Elementary School
- Sta. Rita Elementary School
- Sta. Rita East Elementary School
- Sto. Rosario Elementary School
- UCCP Nursery-Kindergarten School

=== Secondary schools ===
- Aringay National High School
- Aringay Senior High School
- Basca National High School
- Dulao Integrated School
- Manga National High School
- Notre Dame Institute
- St. Barachiel Special Science School

=== Higher educational institution ===
- South Ilocandia College of Arts and Technology

== Economy ==
Poverty incidence of Aringay (%)

Source: Philippine Statistics Authority

The economy of Aringay, a second-income class municipality with a 10.75% poverty incidence as of 2021, is primarily driven by agriculture, fishing, small-scale industries, and a growing emphasis on local businesses and tourism. The town’s economic activities are reflective of its natural resources and the ingenuity of its residents, with agriculture and fisheries providing the foundation for its growth and development.

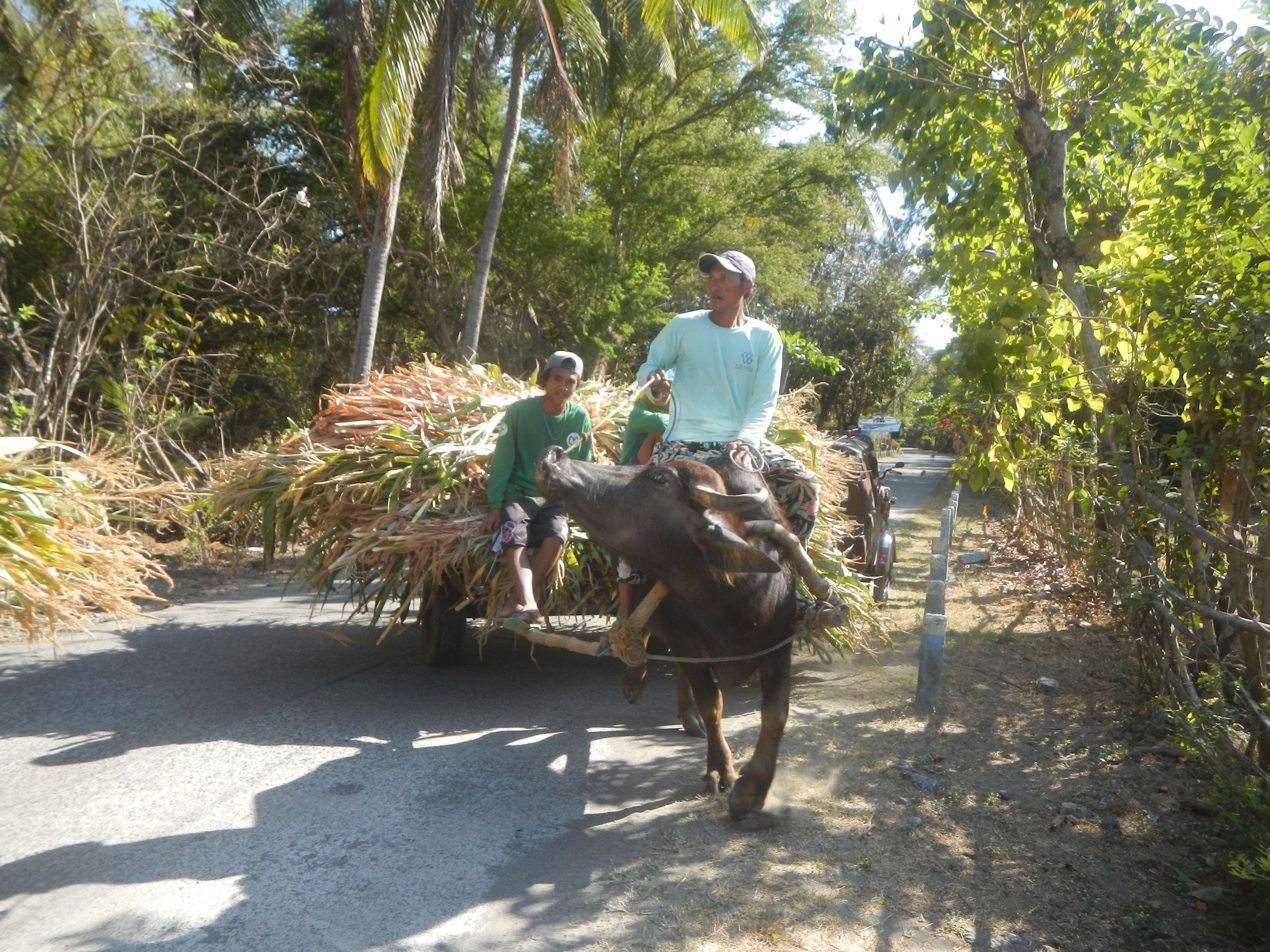
Farmers in Samara

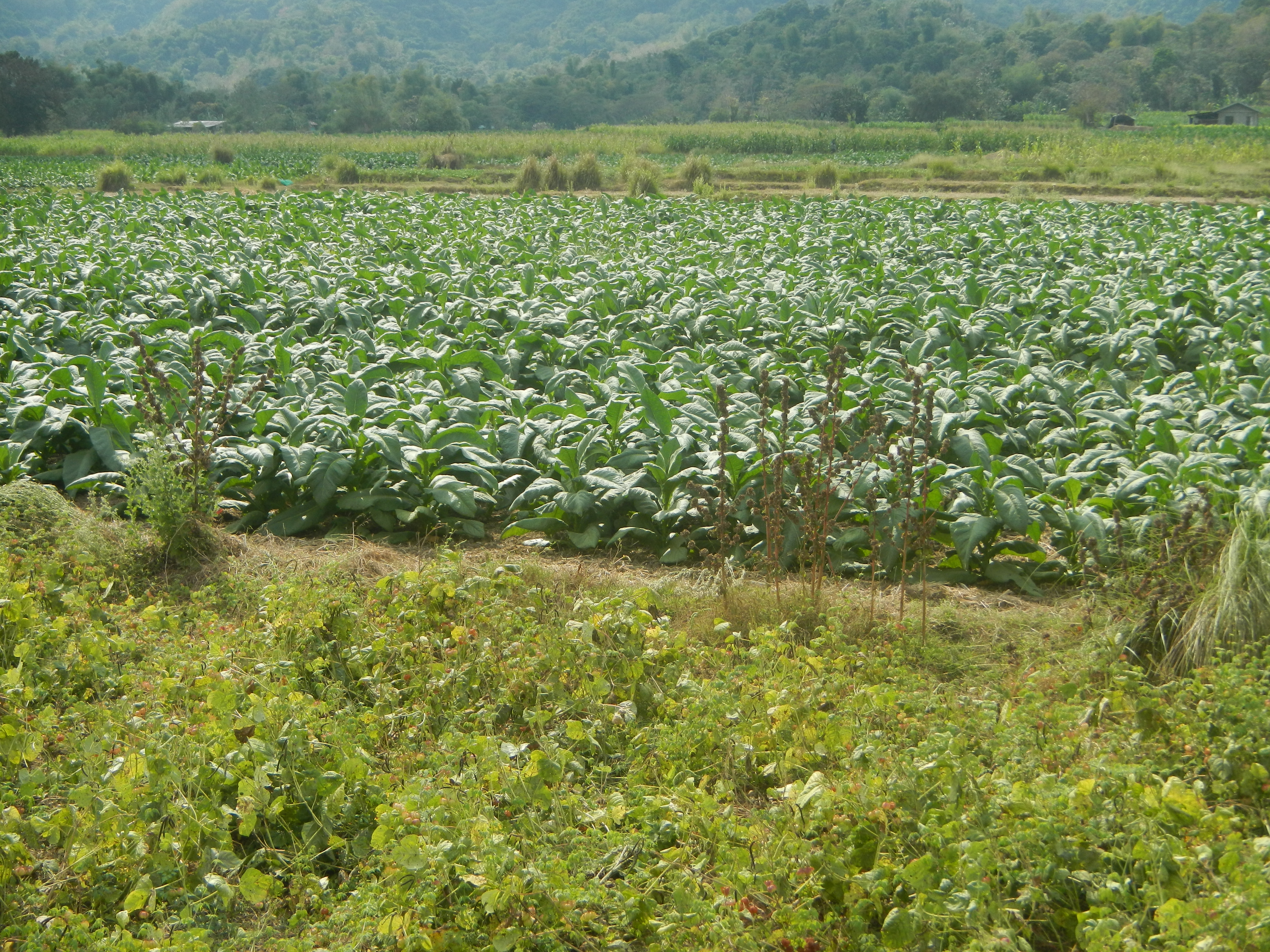
Tobacco fields along Dungan Road

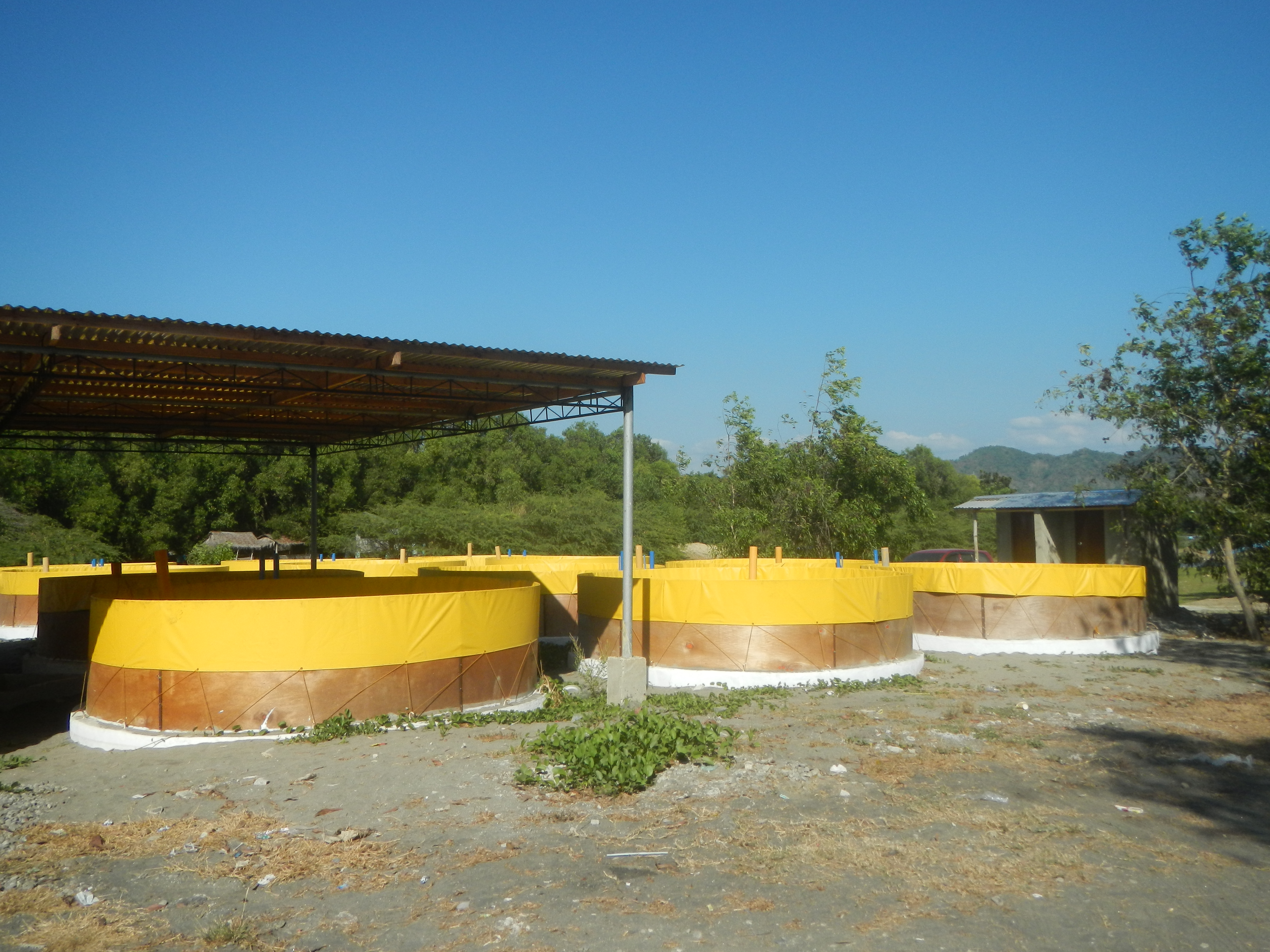
Aquaculture (Fish ponds) in Samara

=== Agriculture ===
Agriculture is the cornerstone of Aringay's economy, with rice, tobacco, sugarcane, corn, root crops, and fruits and vegetables being the primary products. The fertile valleys in the eastern part of the town support the cultivation of these crops, which are crucial for local consumption and trade such as Gallano Rice Terraces. Agricultural practices in the area are diverse, enabling the region to supply both local markets and neighboring areas with various produce.

=== Fishing Industry ===
Aquaculture is a major industry in Aringay, with significant production of bangus (milkfish) which is Arinagy's One Town, One Product, prawns, and oysters in the Aringay River and surrounding areas. Barangays like Alaska, Dulao, Samara, and Sto. Tomas are key players in the fishing sector, supporting local businesses and trade. This industry offers employment to many residents and contributes to the town’s economic vitality through both local consumption and export.

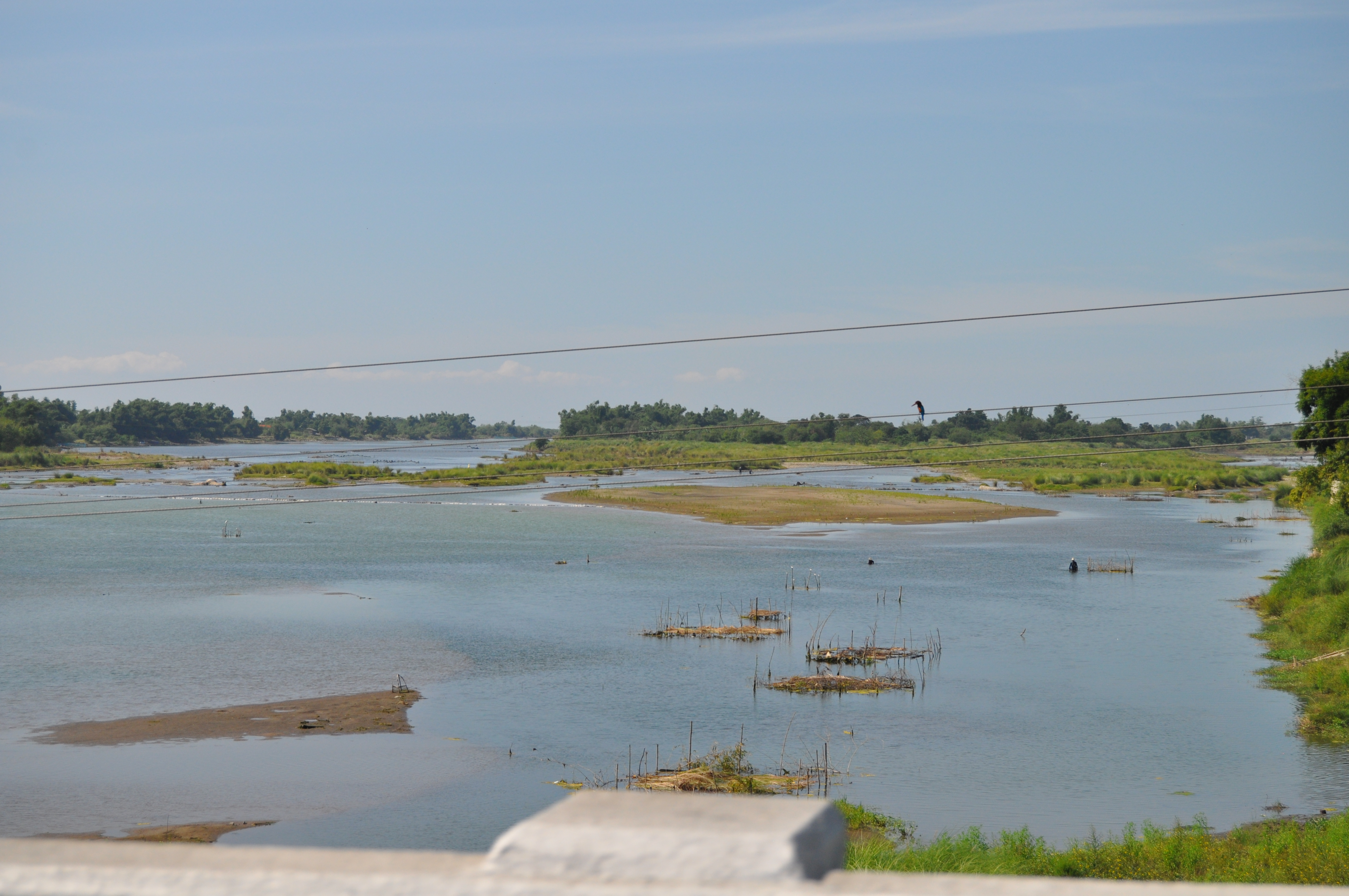
Fishponds along Aringay River

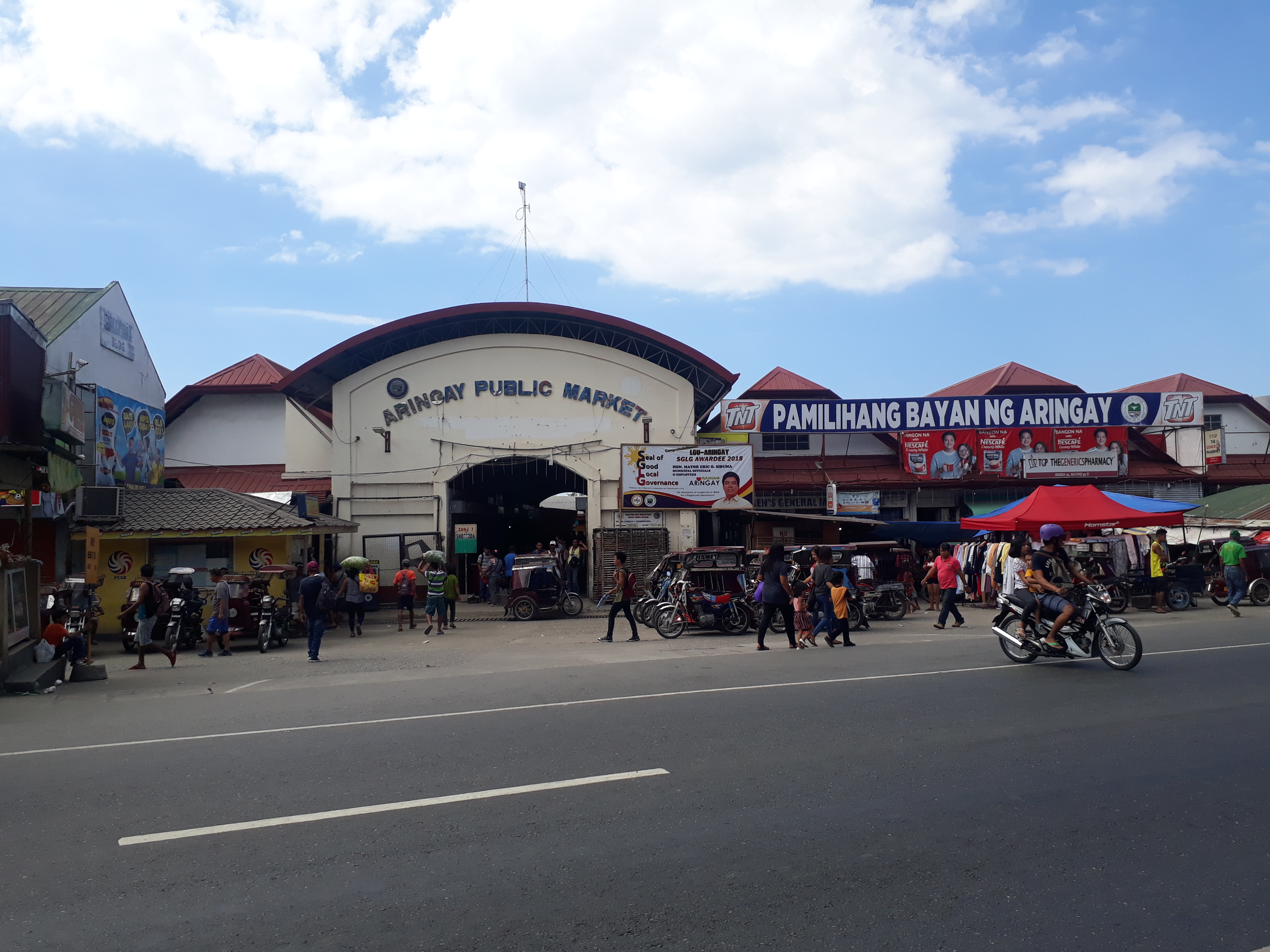
Aringay Public Market

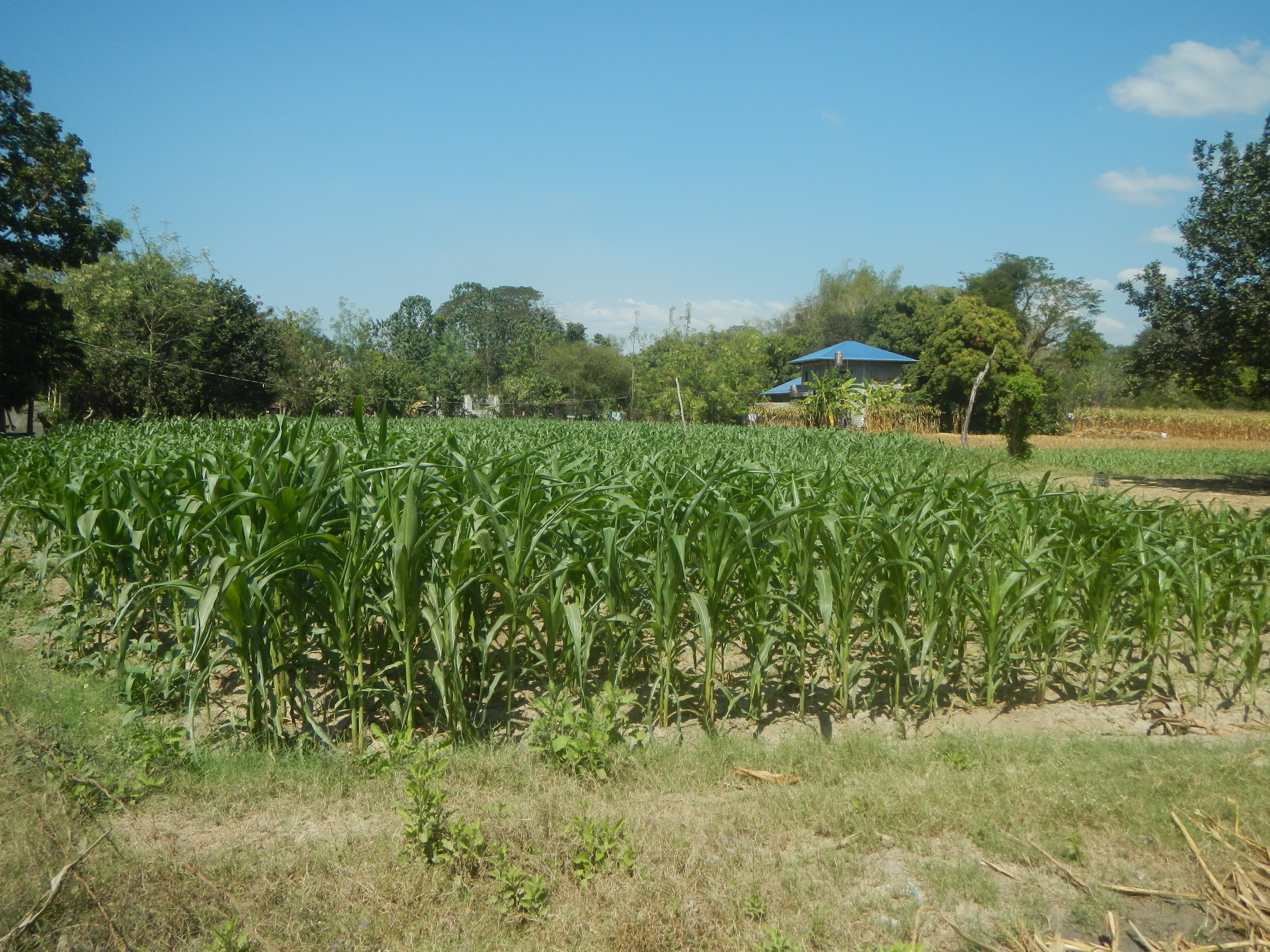
Cornfield in San Juan East

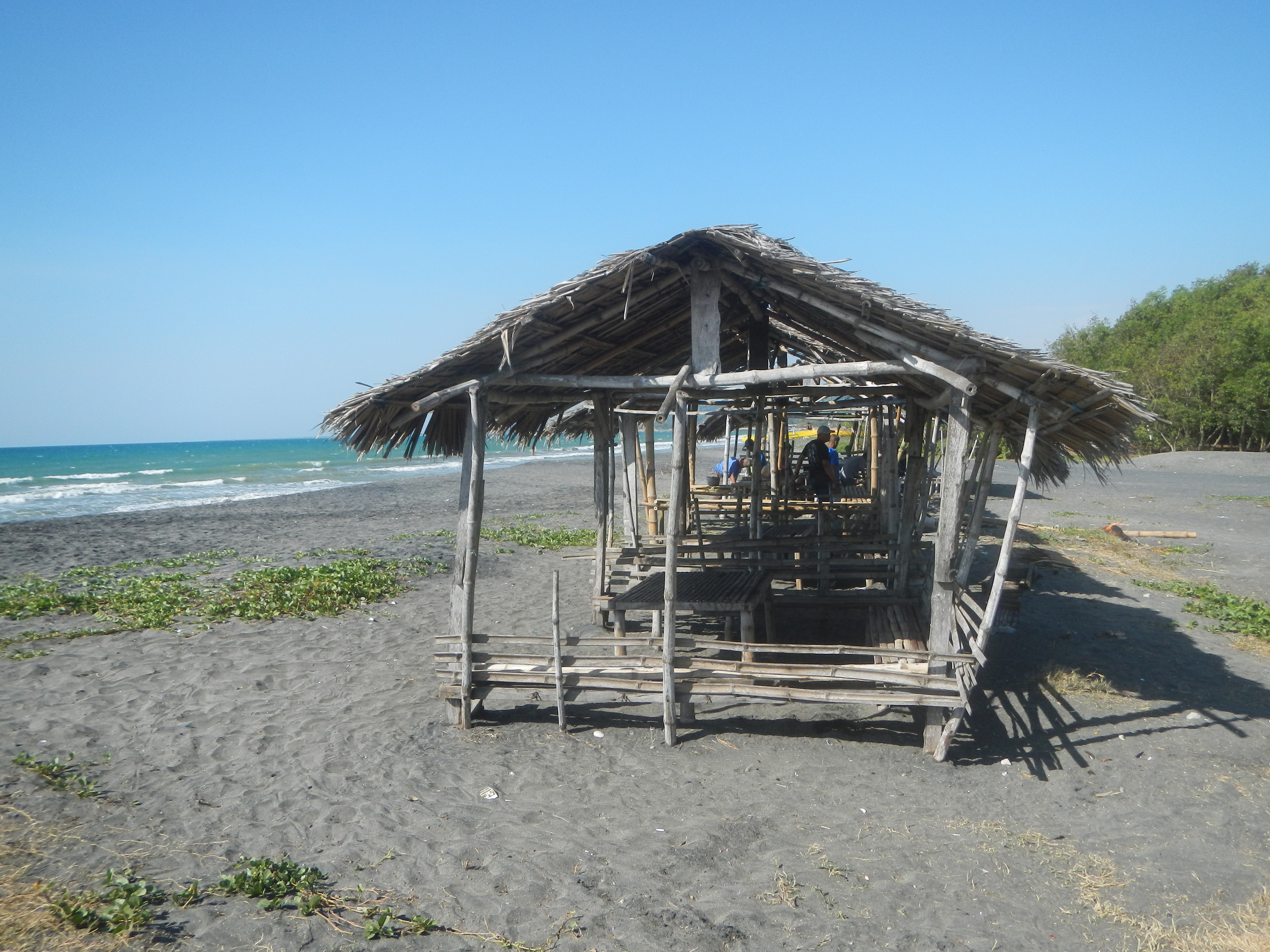
Rental Cottages in Samara Beach

=== Livestock Farming ===
Livestock farming is essential in Aringay, with poultry, carabaos, goats, and swine being raised for local consumption and trade. The livestock sector provides a stable income for many families and supports the agricultural economy. Aringay's farmers use traditional and modern methods to ensure a steady supply of meat, egg, dairy, and other animal products for the community.

=== Tourism ===
Aringay's tourism sector is growing, particularly with its beach resorts and natural attractions that draw both local and international visitors. The town's tourism plan focuses on sustainability, eco-tourism, and expanding its tourism offerings beyond beaches, including agri-tourism and cultural experiences. As tourism continues to thrive, it creates new opportunities for local businesses and provides additional sources of income for the community.

=== Small-Scale Businesses ===
Small businesses in Aringay play a vital role in the local economy, with retail shops, food establishments, and service-oriented enterprises expanding in the town proper. These businesses meet the daily needs of residents and visitors, contributing to local trade and commerce. The growth of small-scale businesses is supported by the town's entrepreneurial spirit and the local government’s initiatives to encourage business development.

As according to Cities and Municipalities Competitive Index, Aringay ranks 369th in Economic Dynamism among 512 municipalities with a score of 3.9693. It excels in Local Economy Growth (19th) and Safety Compliant Business (3rd). The municipality performs well in Cost of Living (25th). However, it struggles in Cost of Doing Business (385th) and Financial Deepening (280th). It shows moderate performance in Productivity (229th) and Presence of Business and Professional Organizations (81st). Aringay ranks low in Local Economy Size (238th).

In Infrastructure, Aringay ranks 328th out of 442 municipalities with a score of 2.0936. It performs strongly in Road Network (45th), Information Technology Capacity (39th), and Financial Technology Capacity (50th). Challenges exist in Distance to Ports (296th) and Transportation Vehicles (286th). Its rankings are moderate in Health (282nd), Education (238th), and Accommodation Capacity (160th). It shows relatively low performance in Local Government Unit Investment.

== Government ==
=== Local government ===
Aringay, belonging to the second congressional district of the province of La Union, is governed by a mayor designated as its local chief executive and by a municipal council as its legislative body in accordance with the Local Government Code. The mayor, vice mayor, and the councilors are elected directly by the people through an election which is being held every three years.

=== Elected officials ===
Members of the Municipal Council (2023-)
Position	Name
Congressman	Dante S. Garcia
Mayor	Benjamin O. Sibuma
Vice-Mayor	Charito O. Sibuma-Yu
Councilors	Maria Isabel D. Diaz
Councilors	Ramsey Pascual D. Mangaoang
Councilors	Woodrow P. Araojo Jr.
Councilors	Rachell Juloya-Martinez
Councilors	Josephine M. Dacanay
Councilors	Karl Adrielle Dave G. Ong
Councilors	Nelda B. Mapile
Councilors	Rolando M. Herrera

== Gallery ==
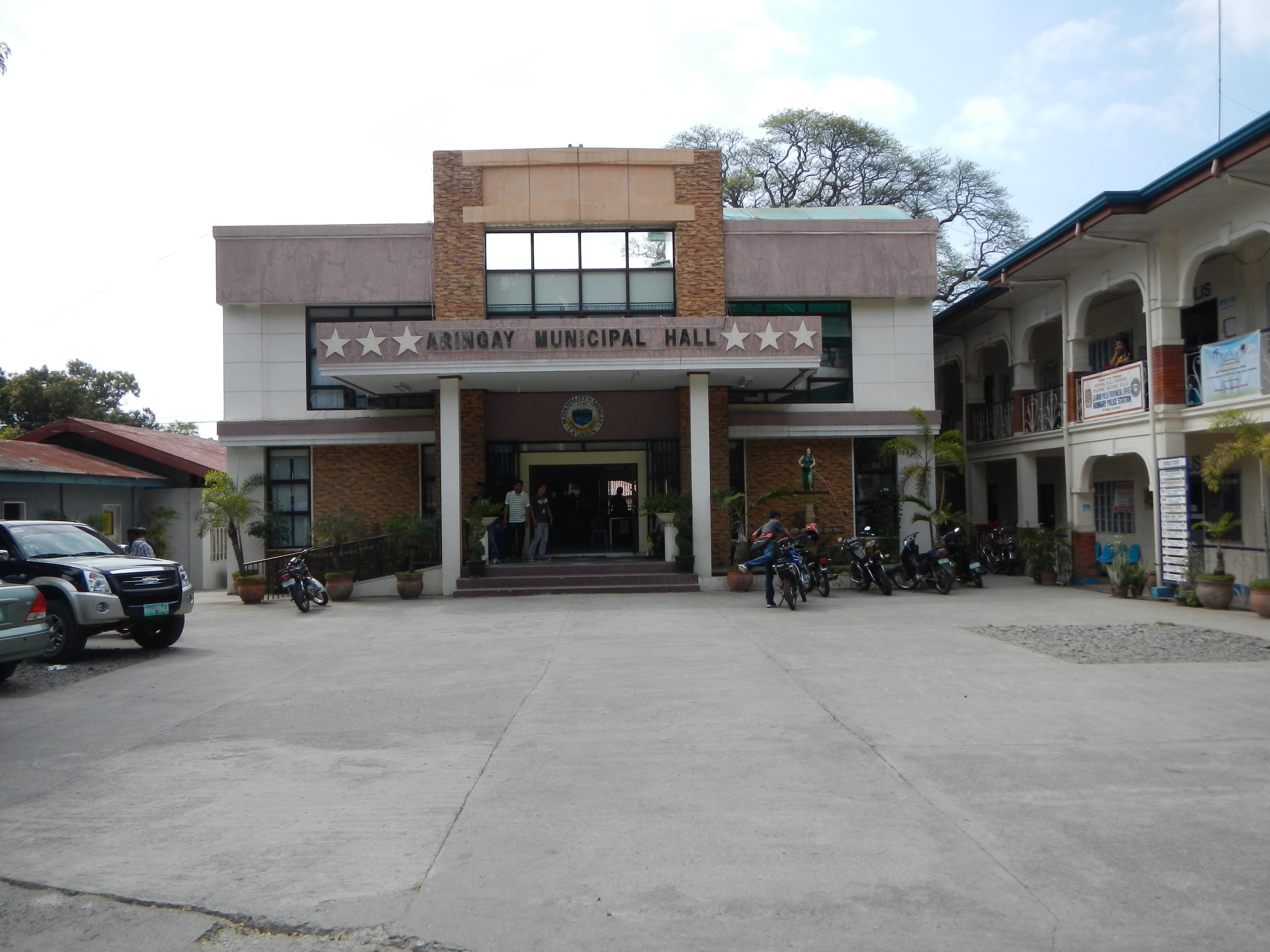
Municipal hall

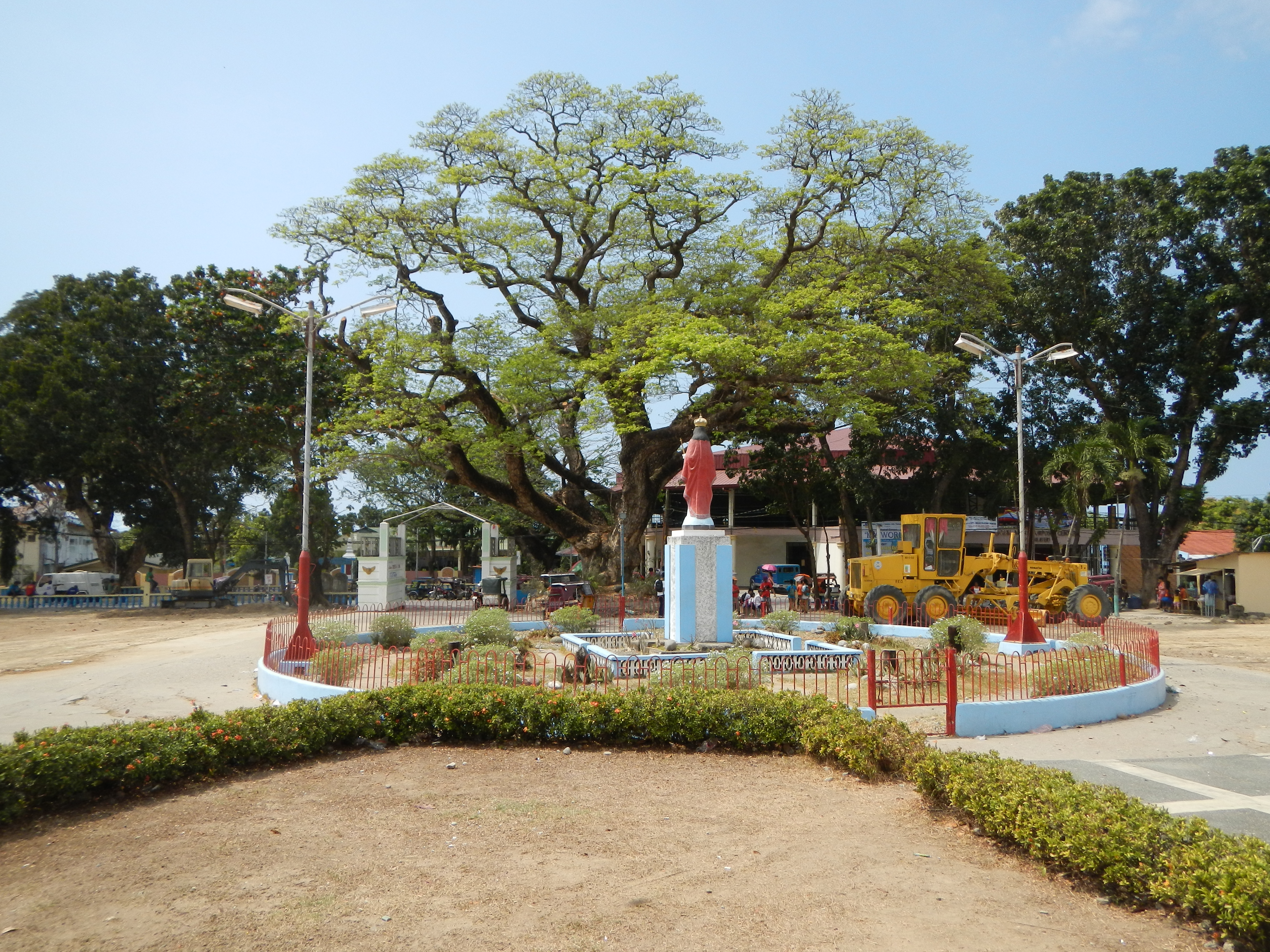
Town plaza

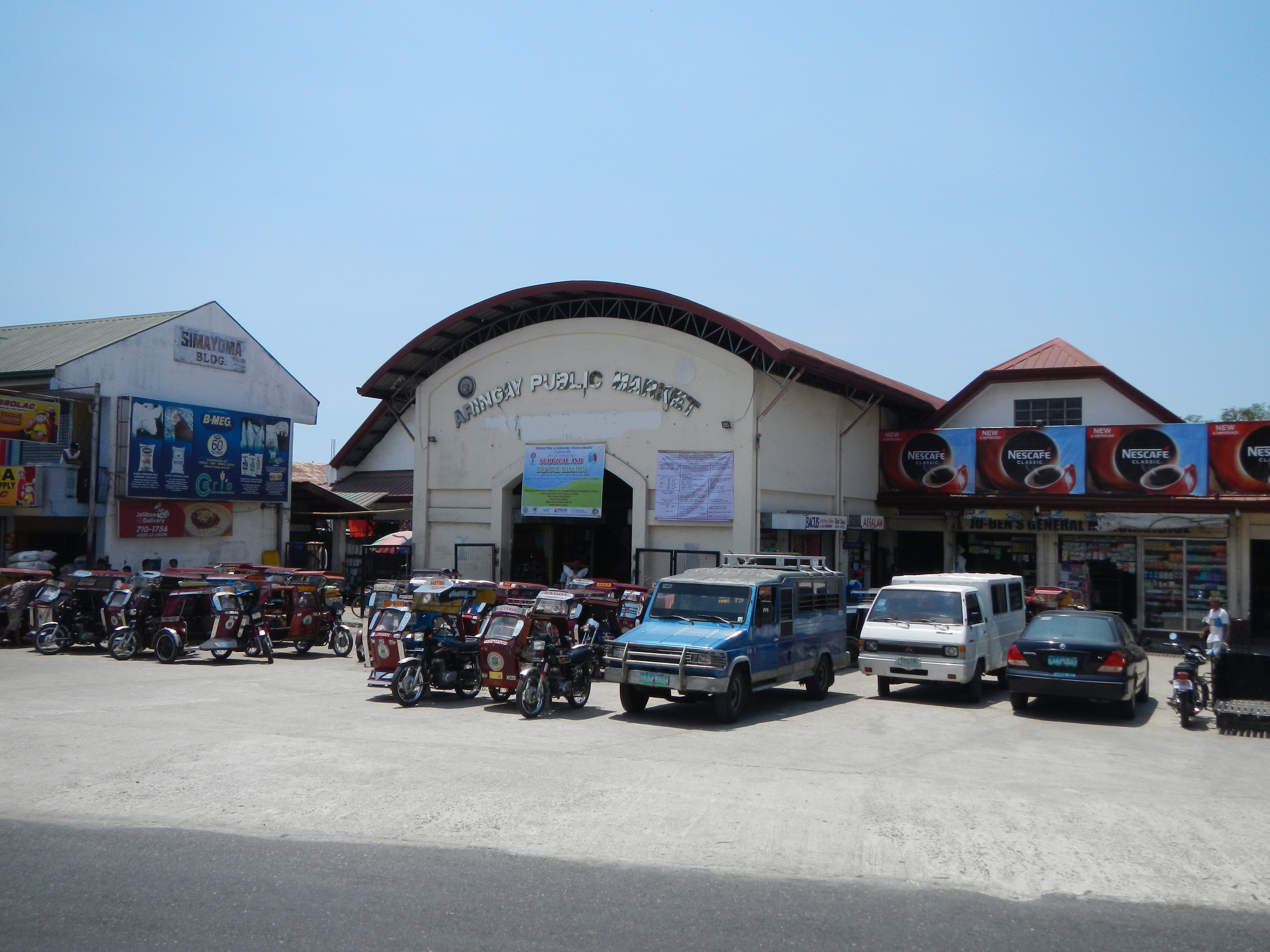
Public market

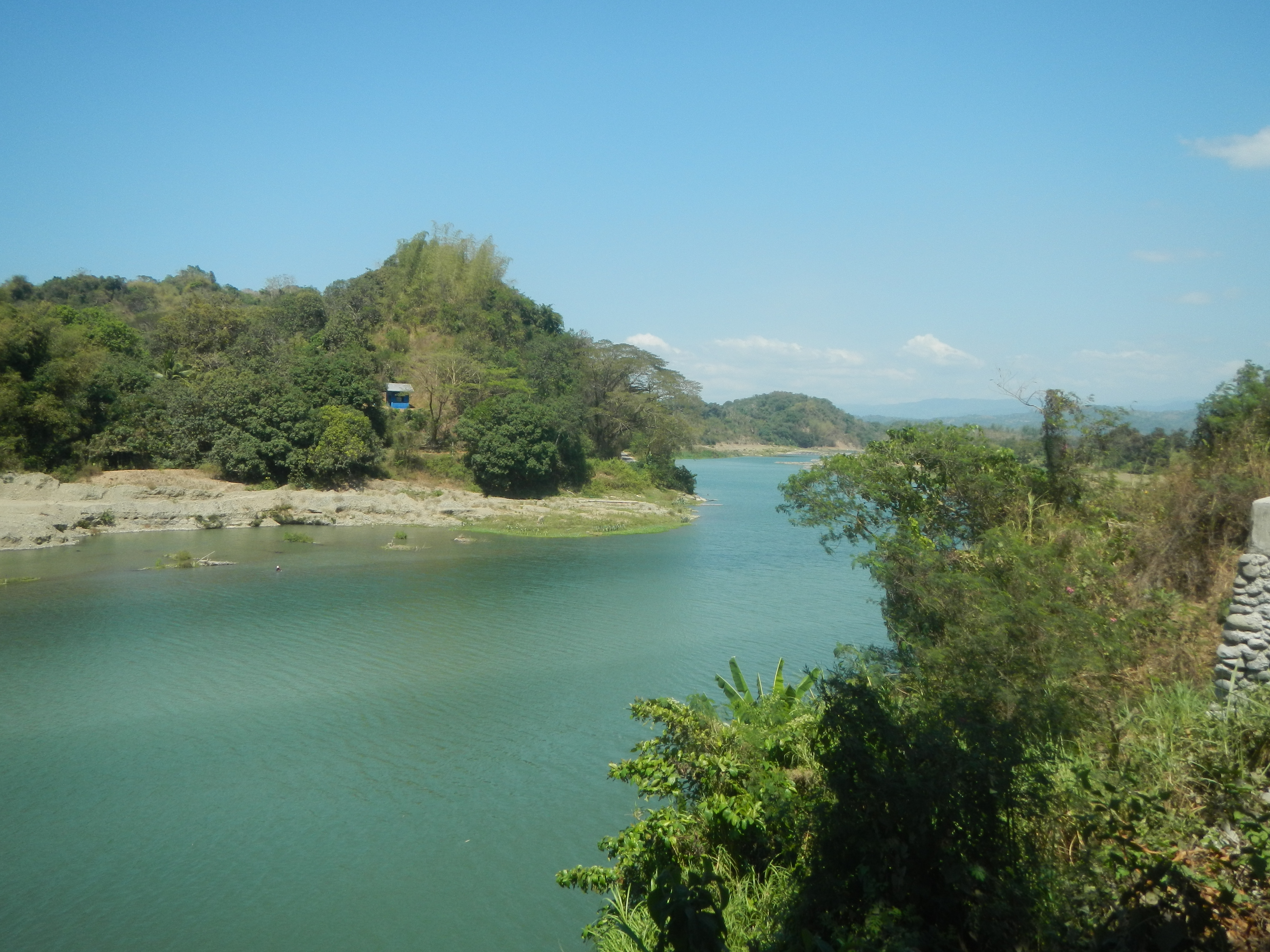
Aringay River along Santa Rita

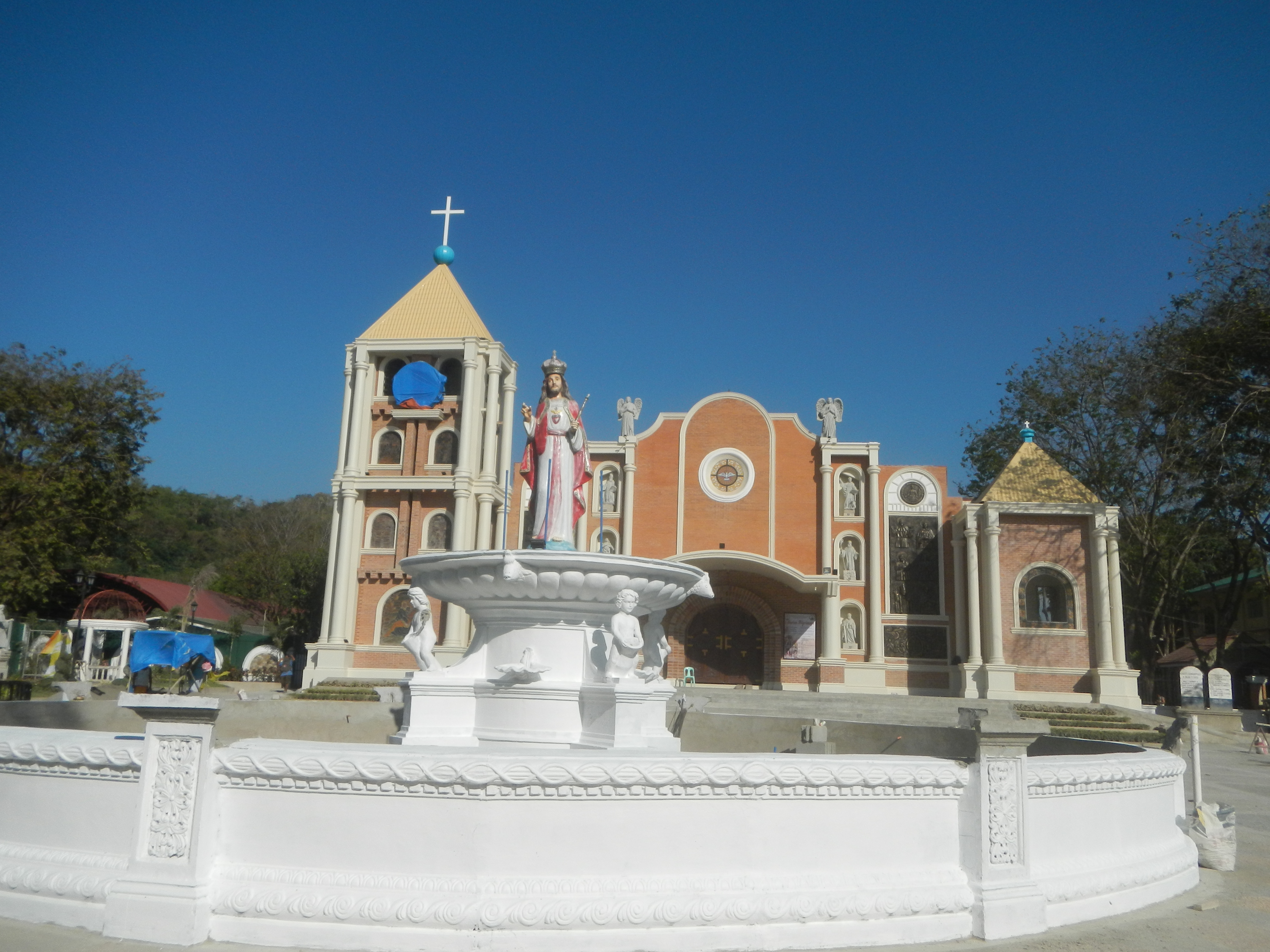
Saint Lucy Parish Church

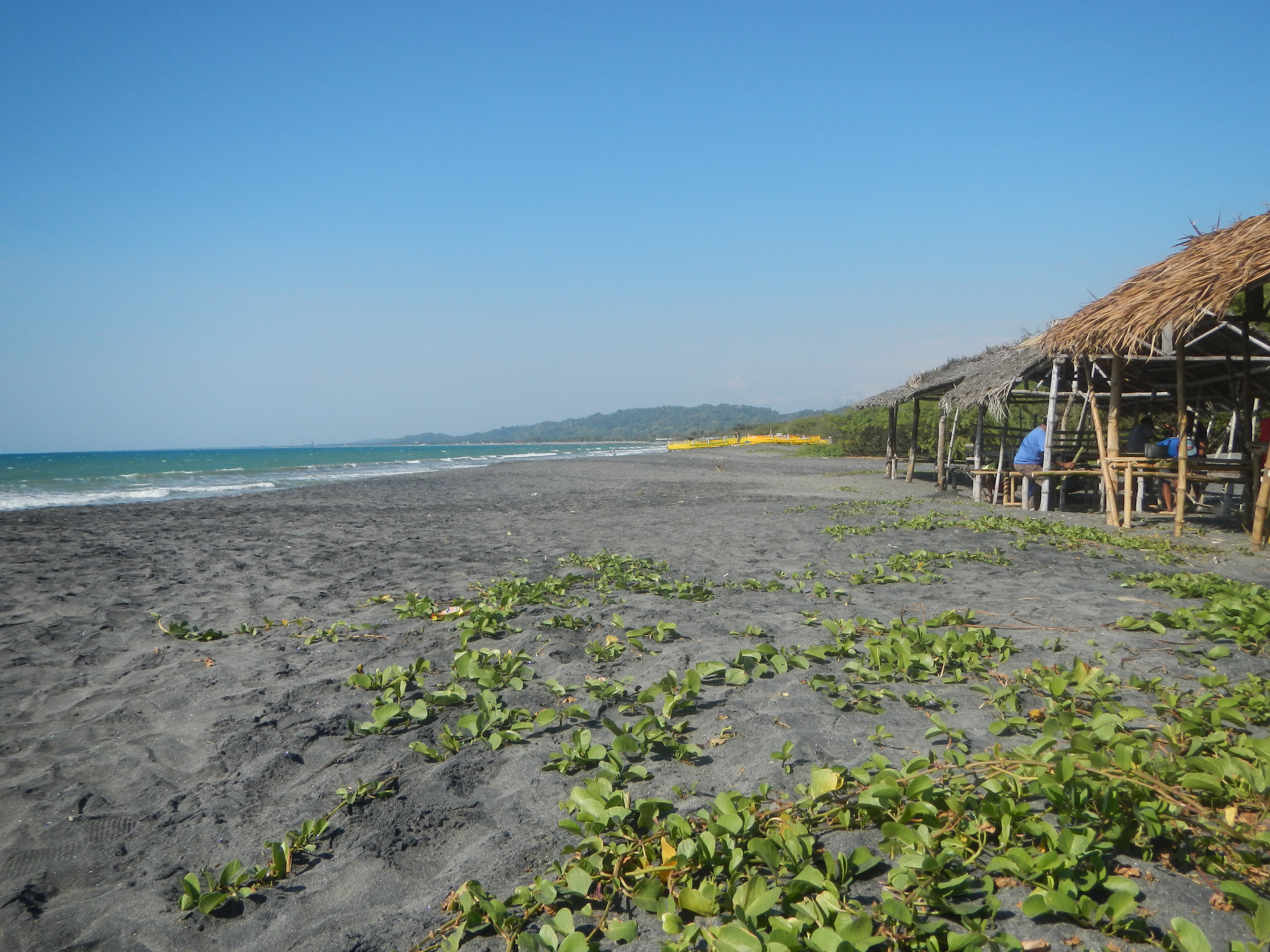
Aringay Beach in Samara

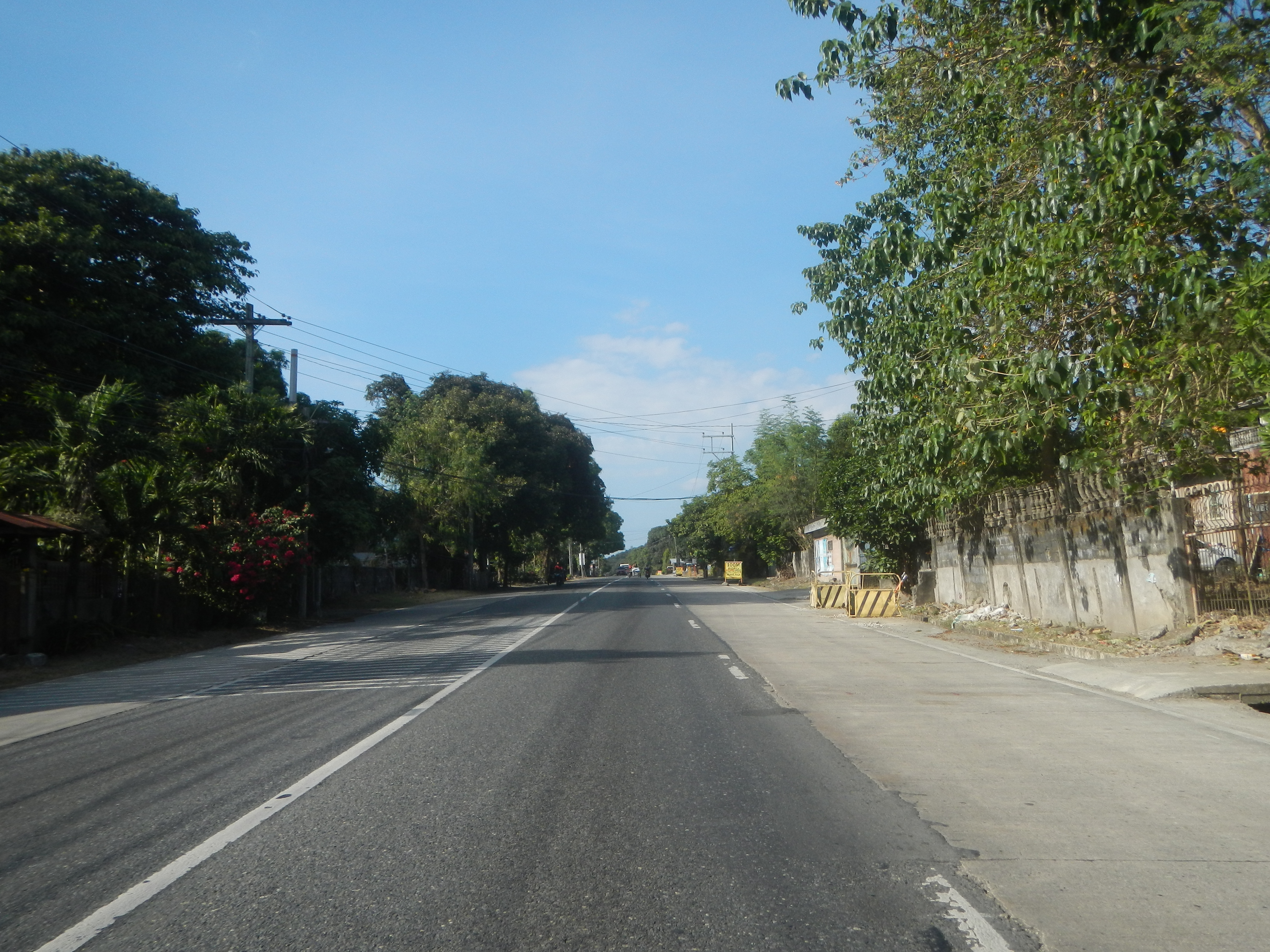
MacArthur Highway along San Eugenio, Aringay

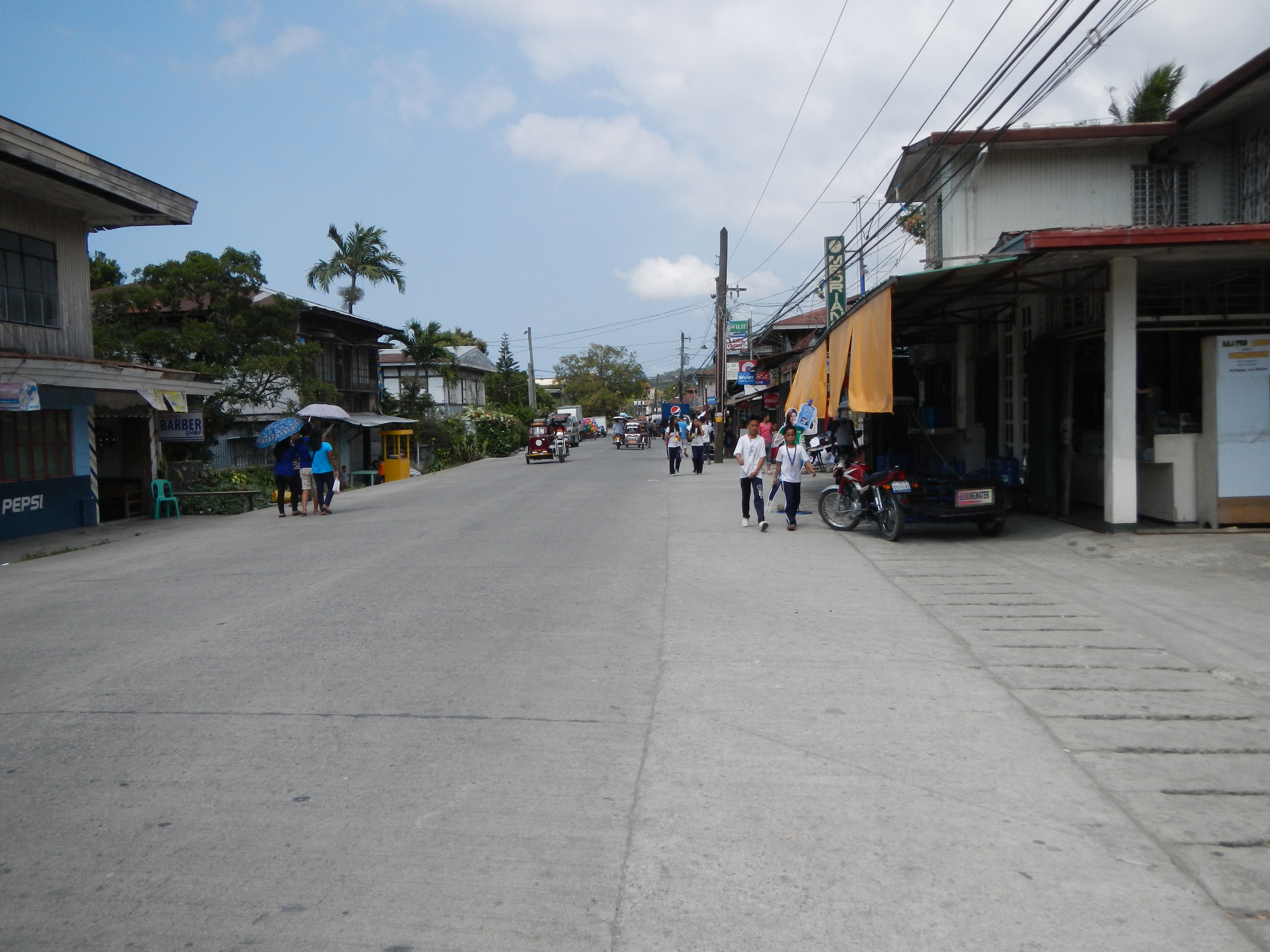
Street view

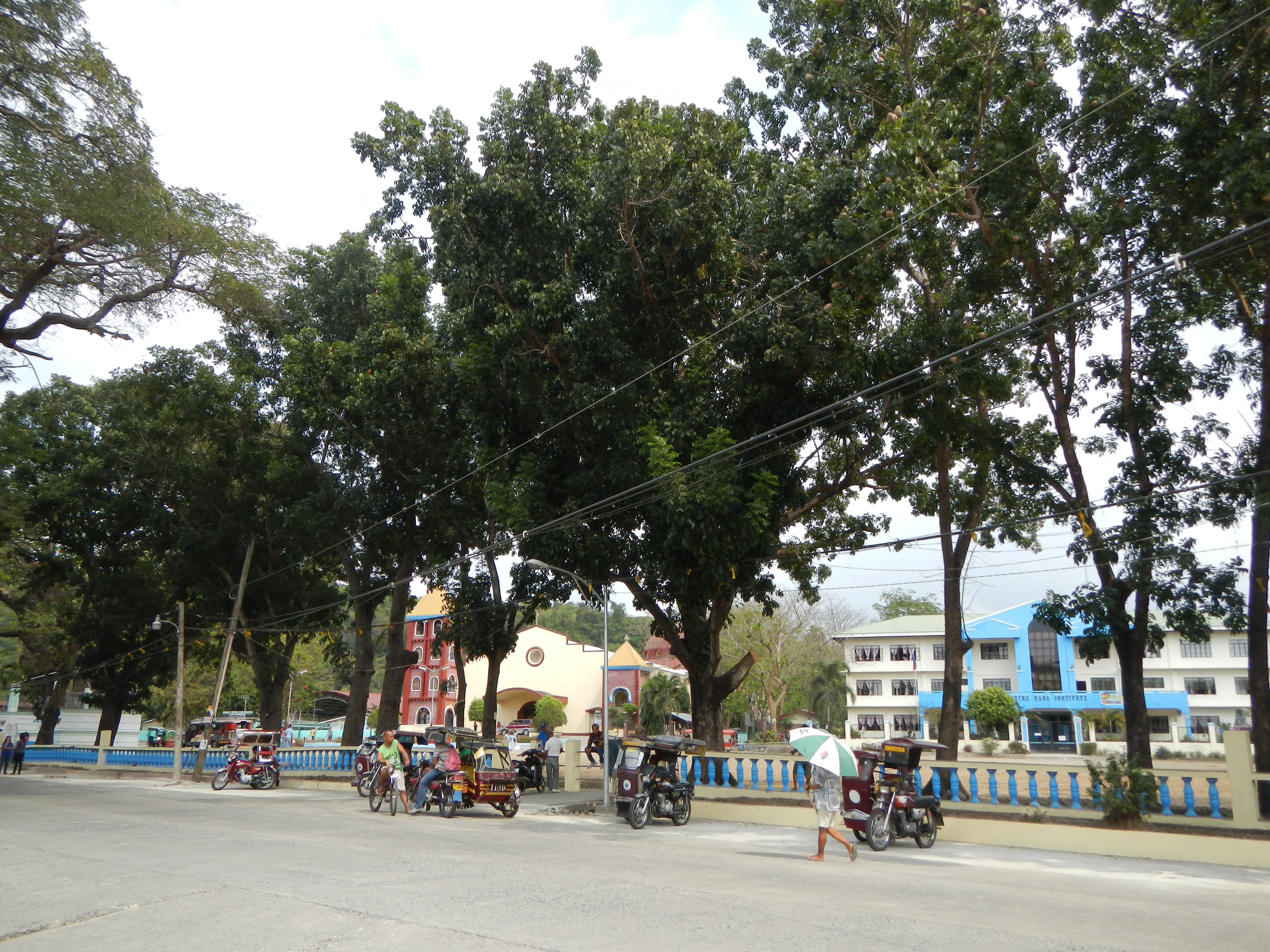
Town Proper

== Notable personalities ==
- Diego Silang - Spanish-colonial era revolutionary leader
- Gloria Diaz - Filipino actress and Miss Universe 1969
- Elpidio Quirino - Sixth President of the Philippines
