= Rosario, La Union =

Municipality in La Union, Philippines

Rosario
- Municipality
- Municipality of Rosario
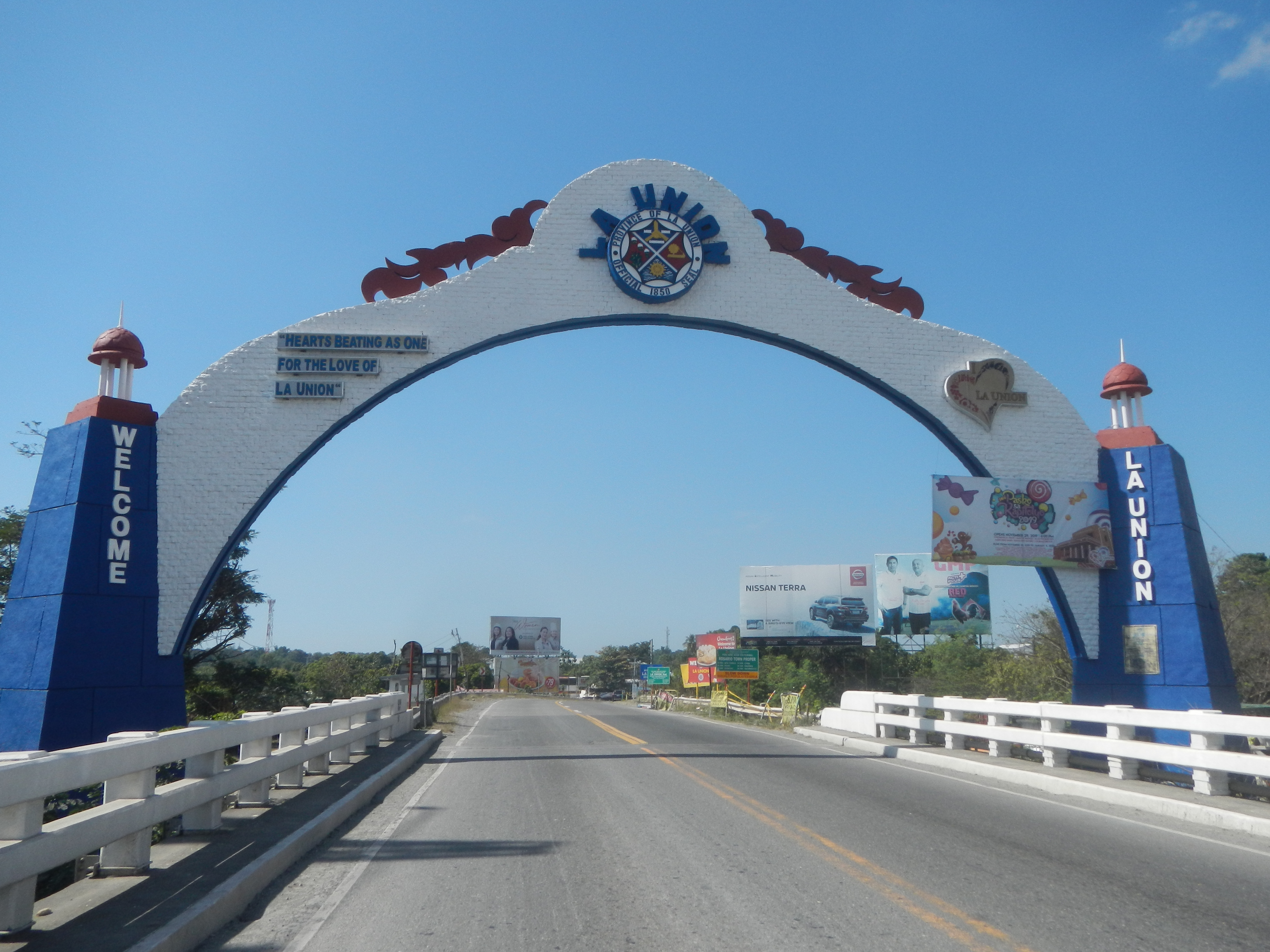
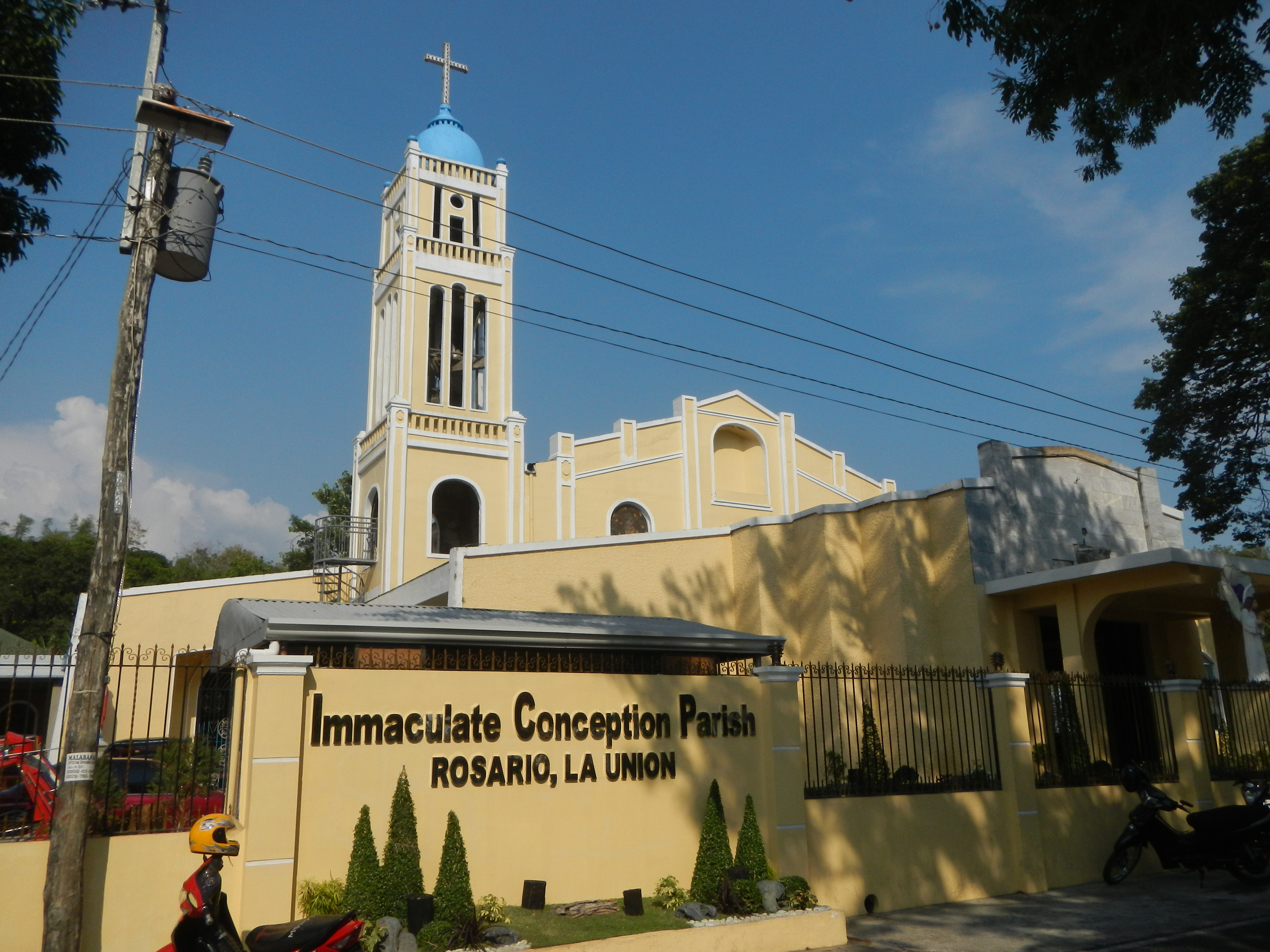
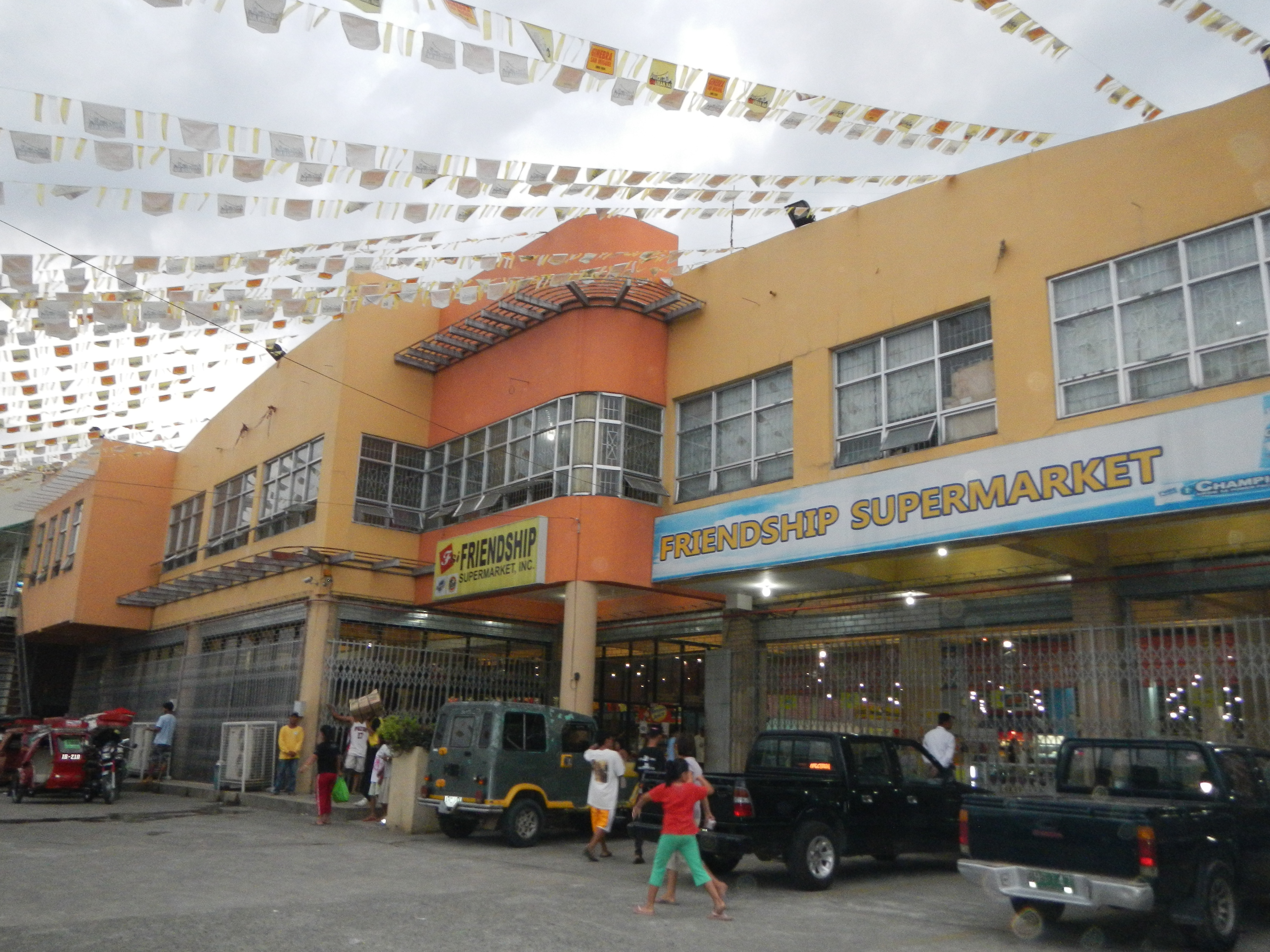
- La Union Welcome Arch, Immaculate Conception Parish Church and Town Proper

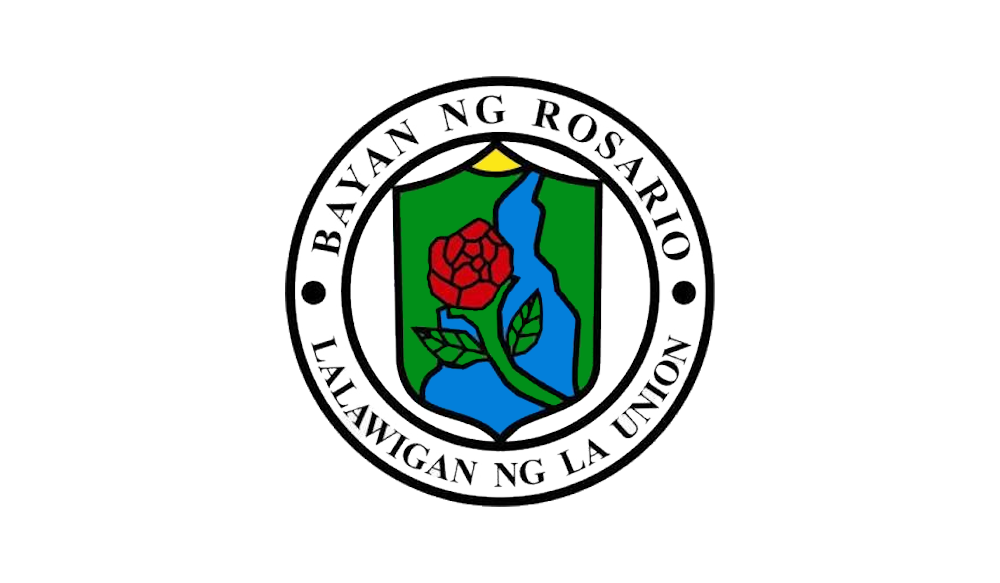
- Flag Seal

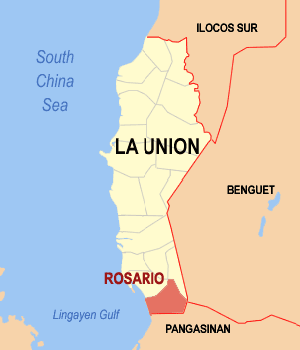
- Map of La Union with Rosario highlighted
- Interactive map of Rosario
- Location within the Philippines
- Coordinates: 16°14′N 120°29′E
- Country: Philippines
- Region: Ilocos Region
- Province: La Union
- District: 2nd district
- Founded: 1869
- Barangays: 33 (see Barangays)

Government
  - Type: Sangguniang Bayan
  - Mayor: Bellarmin A. Flores II
  - Vice Mayor: Bellarmin C. Flores III
  - Representative: Dante S. Garcia
  - Municipal Council: Members: Joseph S. Heruela; Jan Michael G. Viray; Allan S. Sabangan; Cesario T. Licos; Apolinario T. Albay Jr.; Felix T. Madriaga; Rose Lily S. Fuentes; Raul C. Flores
  - Electorate: 38,187 voters (2025)

Area
  - Total: 73.98 km^{2} (28.56 sq mi)
- Elevation: 202 m (663 ft)
- Highest elevation: 945 m (3,100 ft)
- Lowest elevation: 28 m (92 ft)

Population (2024 census)
  - Total: 58,797
  - Density: 794.8/km^{2} (2,058/sq mi)
  - Households: 14,433

Economy
  - Income class: 1st municipal income class
  - Poverty incidence: 9.29% (2023)
  - Revenue: ₱ 382.1 million (2024)
  - Assets: ₱ 924.1 million (2024)
  - Expenditure: ₱ 312.7 million (2024)
  - Liabilities: ₱ 162.6 million (2024)

Service provider
  - Electricity: La Union Electric Cooperative (LUELCO)
- Time zone: UTC+8 (PST)
- ZIP code: 2506
- PSGC: 0103313000
- IDD : area code: +63 (0)72
- Native languages: Ilocano; Pangasinan; Tagalog

Rosario, officially the Municipality of Rosario (Ilocano: Ili ti Rosario; Pangasinan: Baley na Rosario; Filipino: Bayan ng Rosario), is a coastal municipality in the province of La Union, Philippines. According to the 2024 census, it has a population of 58,797 people.

Located at the southernmost tip of La Union, Rosario is known as the "Gateway to Ilocandia" and serves as the terminus of the Tarlac–Pangasinan–La Union Expressway (TPLEX), making it a vital transit hub connecting Central Luzon to Northern Luzon.

== Etymology ==
The origin of the name "Rosario" is explained through several legends. One of the most widely accepted theories suggests that the name derives from the phrase “rosas del río” ("roses of the river"), referring to the picturesque landscape observed by the Spanish explorers upon their arrival. This landscape was characterized by narrow valleys, wild animals, birds, rivers, brooks, dense forests, and a scenic riverscape.

Another version attributes the name to the sight of a range of foothills to the west of the Poblacion, which, from a distance, resemble large rosary beads, thus forming a long, rocky rosary.

A third legend, first documented in 1887, connects the name of the town to an Ilocano mythical creature known as the Marukos (referred to as manrukos in the 1887 text). According to this story, a group of youths were loitering near the floodplains of the Bued River, situated between Rosario and Sison, on a Sunday. They were confronted by an elderly man dressed in white, whose appearance resembled that of a corpse. The Marukos chastised them for engaging in leisure activities on a holy day and placed a curse upon them, causing them to lose their sense of direction. As a result, they failed to notice an impending flash flood.

Ultimately, only a young girl survived by clinging to a Balingkawanay (Pittosporum pentandrum) tree. Some versions of the legend claim that the girl survived by praying the Rosary, while others suggest her name was Rosario. Regardless of the variation, the tale of the Marukos became closely associated with the etymology of the town.

== History ==
=== Early history ===
In its early history, the fertile coastal plains and valleys of the town were settled by the Pangasinan people and its neighboring areas. In the highlands of town, in the foothills of the Cordillera Central and along the Bued River, the Cordillerans (Igorot), specifically the Ibaloi people, established their communities. These settlements primarily engaged in rice cultivation and fishing, forming the foundation of their livelihoods.

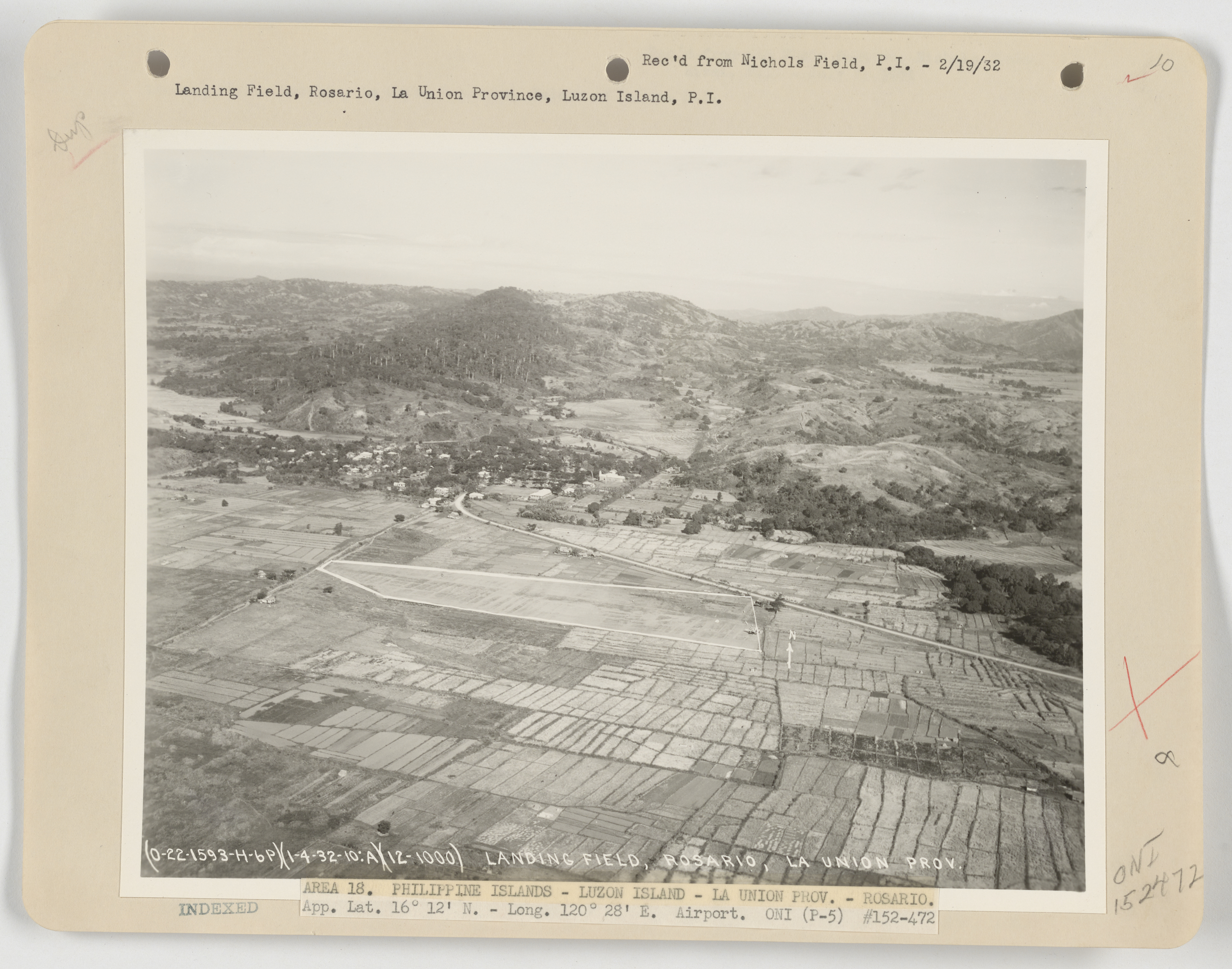
Aerial view of Rosario, 1932

The inhabitants of these settlements were actively involved in trade and barter, engaging with neighboring groups such as the Ilocanos and Tagalogs, as well as with foreign merchants from Japan and China. Trading activities were concentrated along the Lingayen Gulf and the early port of Agoo, which served as a significant trading hub. Gold, mined from the Cordilleras (modern-day Benguet), was the most prized commodity during this period.

Alongside gold, items such as beeswax, porcelain, silk, cotton, gemstones, rice, and beads were exchanged. These goods were traded for luxury items, tools, and other valuable commodities brought by foreign merchants, reflecting a vibrant and interconnected economy.

=== Spanish Colonization ===
In 1572, Spanish forces arrived at the ancient port of Agoo and successfully brought 1,000 natives and Japanese merchants under the authority of the Spanish Crown and the Christian faith. This effort was led by conquistador Juan de Salcedo. By 1578, the Franciscans had established a permanent settlement in the area, constructing a visita (a small mission chapel) made of bamboo. They introduced Catholic catechism to the local population and incorporated the visita into the larger ecclesiastical district centered in Agoo. The present-day towns of Rosario, Santo Tomas, Tubao, Pugo, and Aringay were originally part of Agoo's territorial jurisdiction.

By the 17th century, the Spanish colonial administration had established multiple pueblos, barrios, and rancherías across the region. Rosario, at this time, was part of the vast territory of Mangaldan, which fell under the jurisdiction of Pangasinan province.

In 1764, the town of Santo Tomas was officially separated from Mangaldan through a Spanish Royal Decree, becoming a pueblo (town). Concepción (modern-day Rosario) was designated as a barrio of Santo Tomas. Don Lorenzo de los Reyes was appointed as the first gobernadorcillo of Santo Tomas, responsible for local governance under the Spanish colonial system. However, dissatisfaction with his administration led to the re-incorporation of Santo Tomas into Agoo. In 1785, Santo Tomas regained its status as an autonomous town, following a 21-year period as a barrio of Agoo.

During the 19th century, Rosario remained a barrio of Santo Tomas and was inhabited by a mixture of Igorot rancherías, Pangasinenses, and Ilocano settlers. Increasing population pressures, combined with the harsh conditions under Spanish rule, led to a significant migration from Ylocos provinces from Magsingal, Vigan, Candon, and nearby towns such as Agoo, Santo Tomas, Tubao, and San Fernando. The growing population and economic activity prompted calls for Rosario to be converted into a separate town.

Rosario was once part of Pangasinan. On October 29, 1849, Governor-General Narciso Zaldua Clavería issued a decree creating the province of La Union by merging eight towns from Pangasinan, three from Ilocos Sur, and 40–45 rancherías, including those in Rosario. San Fernando was designated as the provincial capital. This new provincial structure was formalized on March 2, 1850, through a Superior Decreto signed by Governor-General Antonio María Blanco and confirmed on April 18, 1854, by a royal decree (Real Orden) from Queen Isabella II of Spain.

==== Formation of Rosario ====
The official establishment of Rosario as a town began on August 7, 1869, when liberal Governor-General Carlos de la Torre issued a decree converting the barrio of Concepción into a civil town, renaming it Rosario. However, the town remained ecclesiastically dependent on Santo Tomas. This conversion was initiated by a formal petition from local leaders, including Don Mariano Posadas, Don Mariano Narcelles, and Don Gavino Ordoña.

Sixteen days later, on August 23, Gobernador Político-Militar Francisco Paula de Ripoll received a copy of the decree and promptly scheduled the election of Rosario’s gobernadorcillo (town governor) and ministro de justicia (minister of justice). The municipal leadership was guided by a tribute payer list provided by Santo Tomas.

Despite this administrative progress, the local Catholic bishop expressed concerns about assigning an assistant priest to Rosario, citing the diminished stipends caused by the town’s separation from Santo Tomas. Consequently, Rosario became La Union’s 13th civil town but remained spiritually dependent on its former matriz (mother parish) in Santo Tomas. The parish priest continued to oversee both towns, ensuring his income was not affected.

On June 9, 1884, an expediente issued by the provincial government documented the dialects spoken by Rosario’s inhabitants. Both Pangasinan and Ilocano were widely spoken, reflecting the town’s geographical proximity to Pangasinan. Ilocano, however, emerged as the lingua franca of Rosario.

On February 26, 1891, Governor José de la Guardia described the residents of Rosario’s heavily populated rancherías as "peace-loving" (son de carácter pacífico). The majority of the population maintained strong ties to their ancestral lands and primarily engaged in agriculture and commerce, cultivating crops such as rice, tobacco, corn, sweet potatoes, and sibucao (a type of wood used for dye).

In 1894 and 1896, the province published a master list of barangays, barrios, and rancherías. Rosario, along with the towns of Naguilian, Balaoan, and Tubao, recorded a significant Igorot population. Rosario alone had 1,774 Igorot inhabitants across nine rancherías, with Ranchería Sapid hosting the largest population of 269 individuals. Don Pioc served as the gobernadorcillo overseeing these communities.

=== Philippine Revolution ===
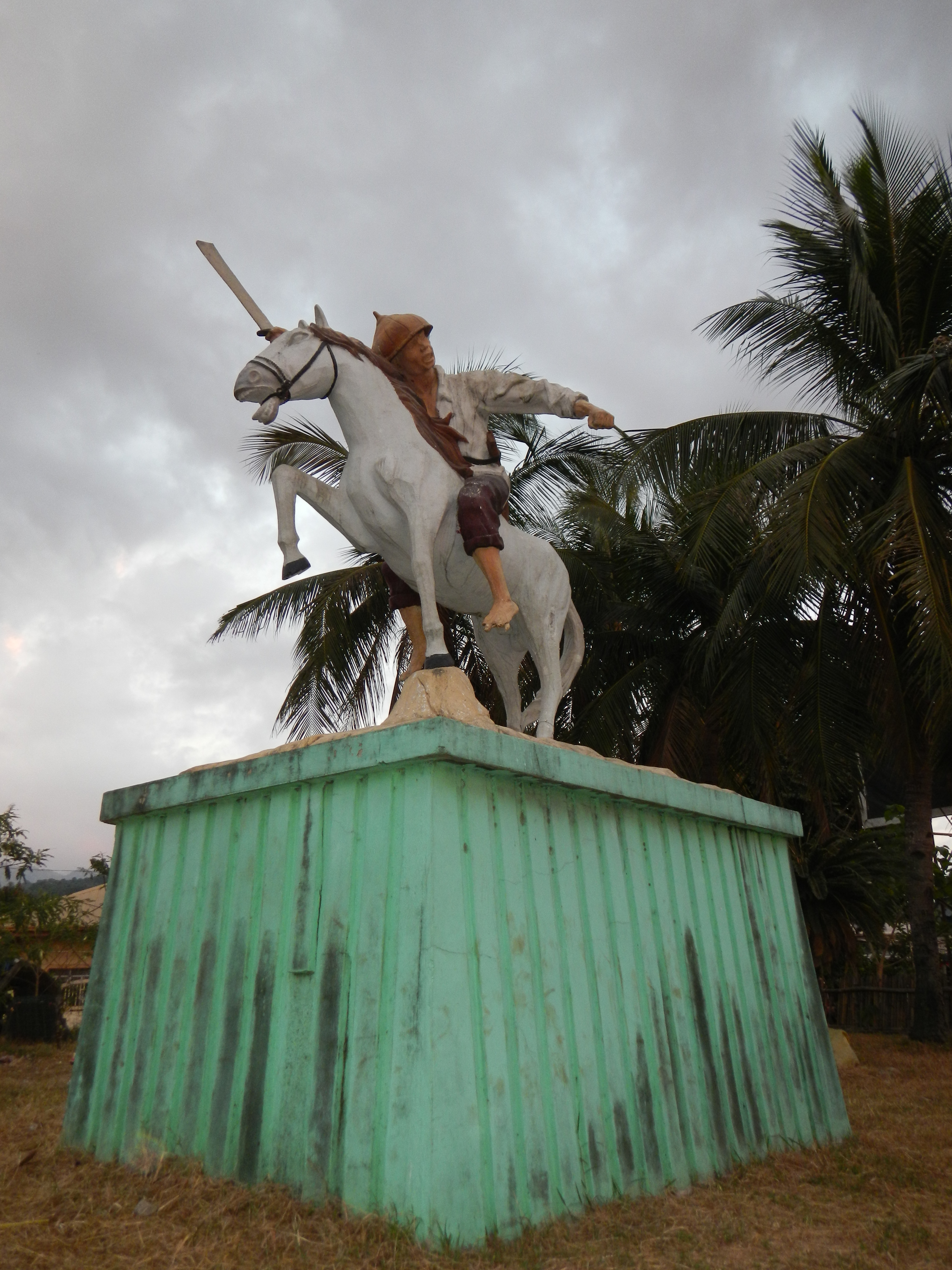
Statue of Philippine Revolutionist

During the initial phase of the Philippine Revolution in early 1897, the people of Rosario did not immediately take up arms but instead expressed sympathy for the uprising. Rosario contributed five volunteers to the Spanish effort to suppress the revolution. Despite the town's relatively passive involvement, Spanish authorities enacted harsh reprisals, including torture and false accusations, targeting local elites, clergy, and suspected rebels among the town’s population.

However, by May 22, 1898, a small uprising in Santo Tomas sparked the revolution in Rosario and the entire province of La Union. The people of Rosario actively participated in the fight for independence against Spanish colonial rule. Under the leadership of General Manuel Tinio y Bondoc, a close ally of President Emilio Aguinaldo, the locals engaged in significant resistance efforts in Northern Luzon. They attacked Spanish garrisons in several towns of La Union, particularly the convents in Agoo and San Fernando. Spanish authorities and priests were forced to flee to Vigan and Manila.

By August 18, 1898, La Union achieved final victory, marking the collapse of Spanish resistance in the province.

=== American Colonization ===
Following the surrender of General Manuel Tinio's brigade to American forces in Sinait, Ilocos Sur, on May 1, 1901, the Philippine-American War in La Union came to an end.

Under American colonization, the town of Rosario underwent administrative changes. Through Act No. 935, passed on October 9, 1903, the 15 pueblos of La Union were reduced to 12, with the towns of Santo Tomas and Rosario combined into one municipality, with Santo Tomas serving as the centro de administracion (administrative center). However, on October 25, 1907, Governor-General James Francis Smith issued a mandate reinstating Rosario as a regular municipality, restoring the original boundaries of the 12 towns established during the Spanish period.

On February 18, 1914, Governor-General Francis Burton Harrison transferred jurisdiction over Camp One from Benguet to La Union. The boundary between Rosario, La Union, and Alava, Pangasinan, was defined by the Bued River.

During the American period, public schools were established in Rosario to promote Americanization through the teaching of English. The former Spanish convents were repurposed as classrooms, and the Thomosites, a group of American teachers, were assigned to educate the Philippines. Rosario, along with other southern towns, was one of the first to receive instructional supplies.

In addition to education, the American government set up public hospitals to combat cholera epidemic, with Rosario establishing a one-man health board.

In the 1920s, Rosario became embroiled in a territorial dispute with Benguet over a new boundary line. This conflict led to several petitions for intervention from the governors of both provinces, including a visit from Governor Zandueta of La Union. The dispute was resolved after the abolition of the Lepanto-Bontoc sub-provinces, and Rosario's territorial boundaries were restored.

=== Japanese Occupation ===
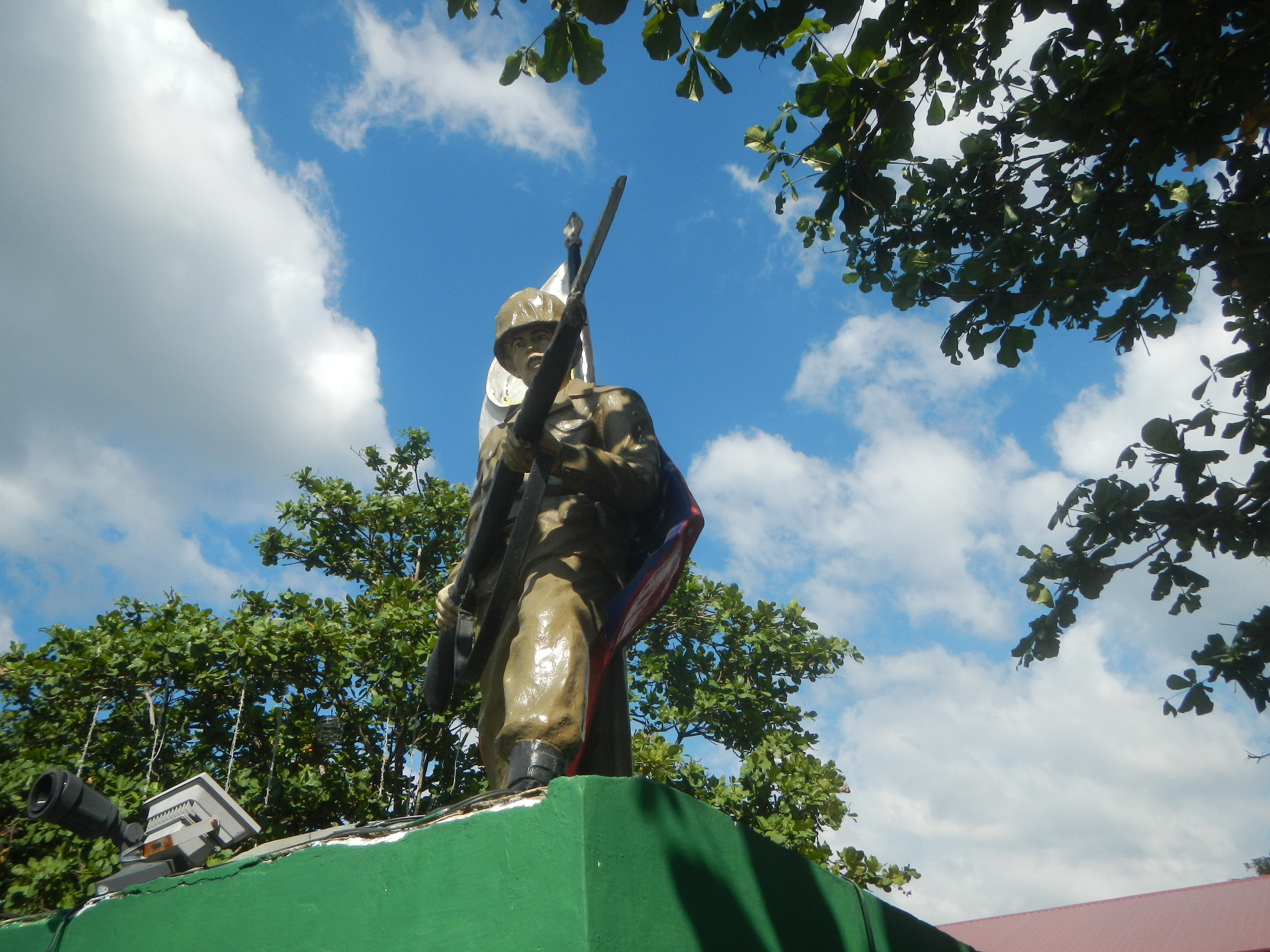
A monument honoring World War II heroes, veterans, and guerrillas in Rosario, La Union.

On December 8, 1941, Japanese forces attacked Rosario by bombing several residential areas and U.S. military installations, including Camp One. On December 22, 1941, the Japanese 4th Tank Regiment and the 47th Infantry Regiment, under the command of Colonel Isamu Yanagi, supported by a flotilla of navy ships, attempted to land in Agoo. Their objective was to establish one of three major beachheads for the Japanese invasion of the Lingayen Gulf. However, inclement weather dispersed their forces, forcing them to land over a wide stretch of beach, ranging from Poro Point (San Fernando) to as far south as Damortis.

The Japanese forces later encountered the Philippine Commonwealth defense forces, which included the 26th Cavalry Regiment (Philippine Scouts), the 21st and 11th Divisions of the Philippine Army, and the newly formed 71st Division. This encounter led to the Battle of Rosario.

The Japanese occupation of the town ended after the Battle of Bacsil Ridge in San Fernando, marking a significant turning point in the liberation of La Union.

== Geography ==
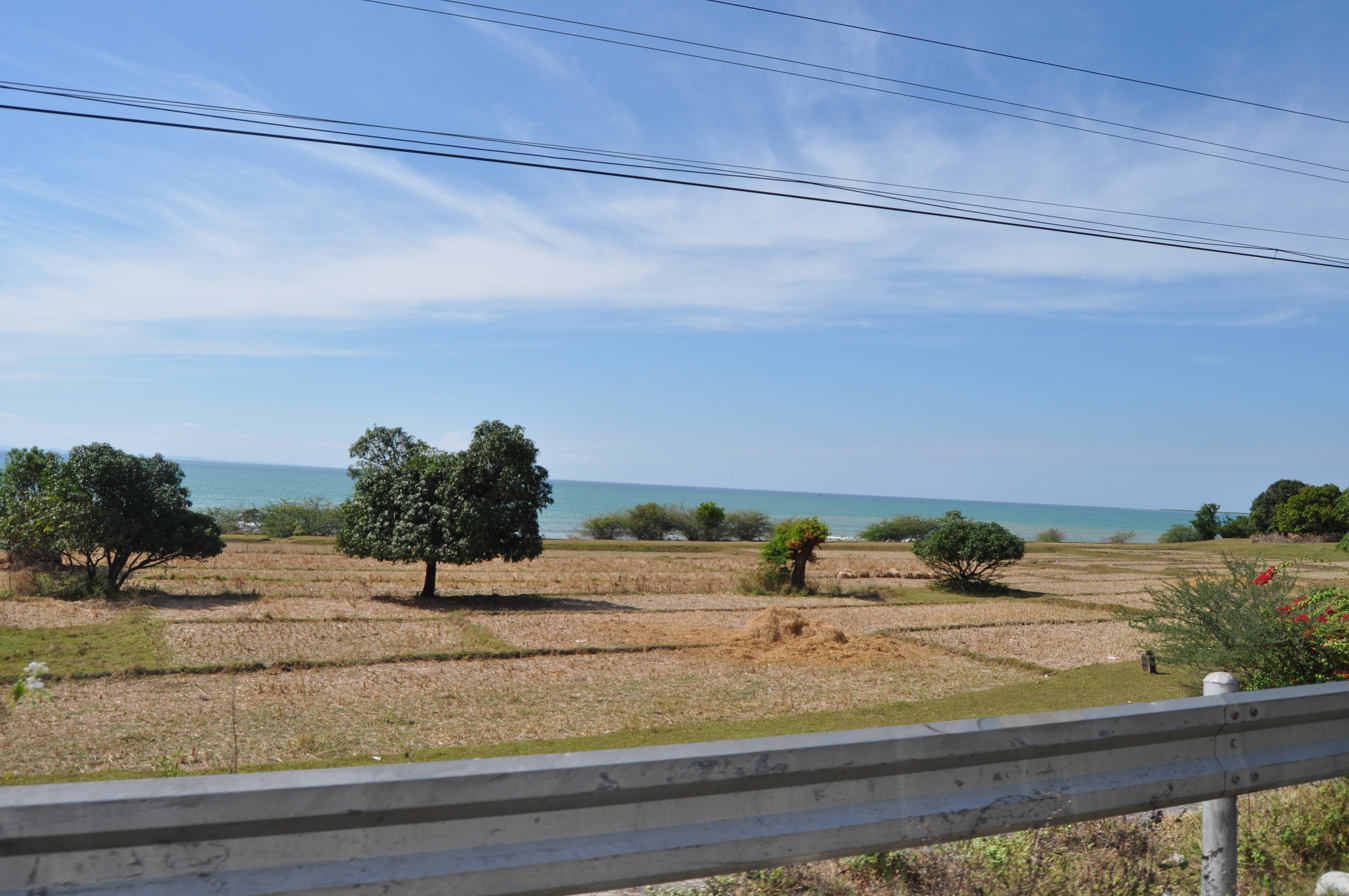
Landscape in Rabon

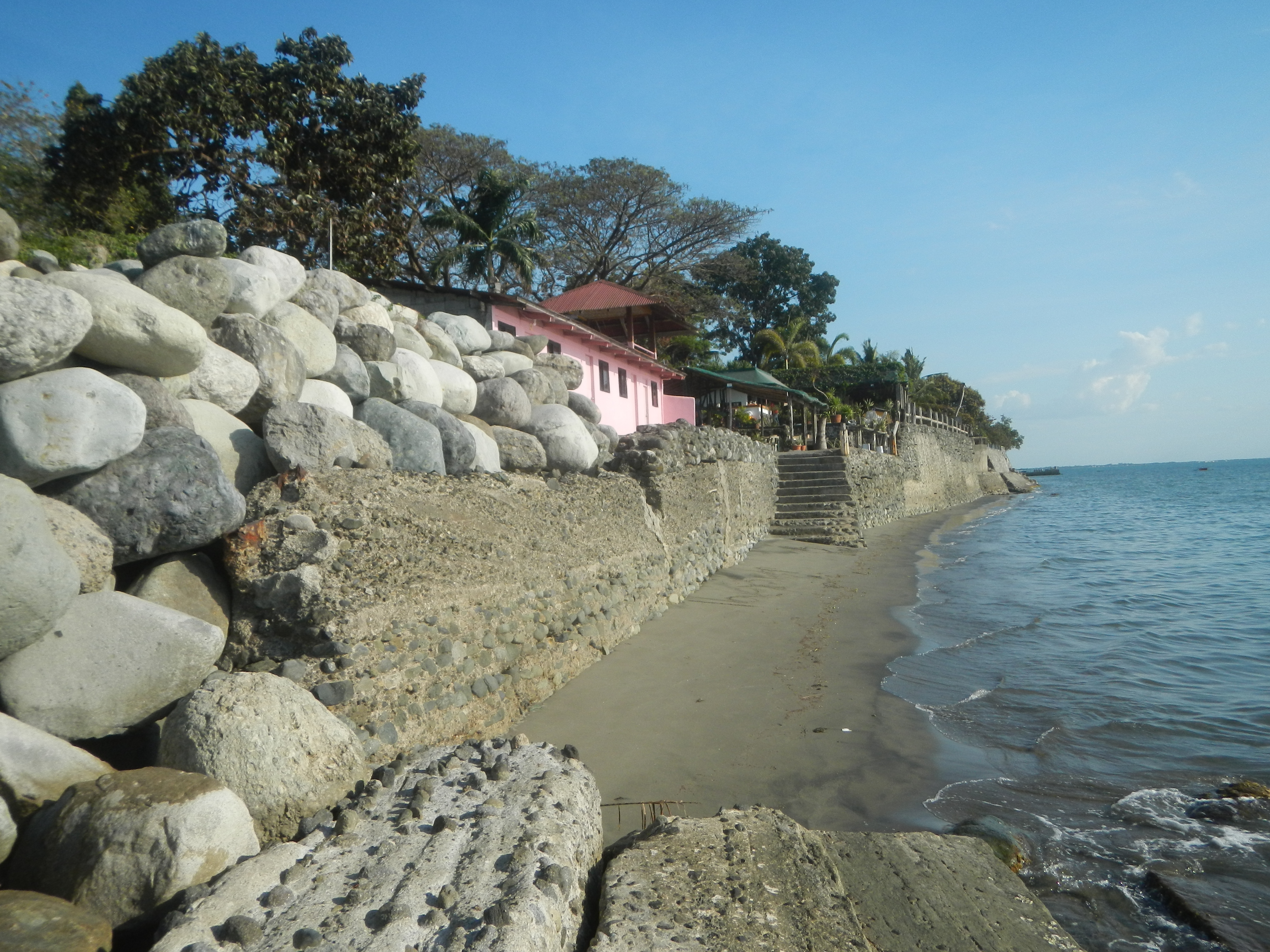
Coastal area in Damortis

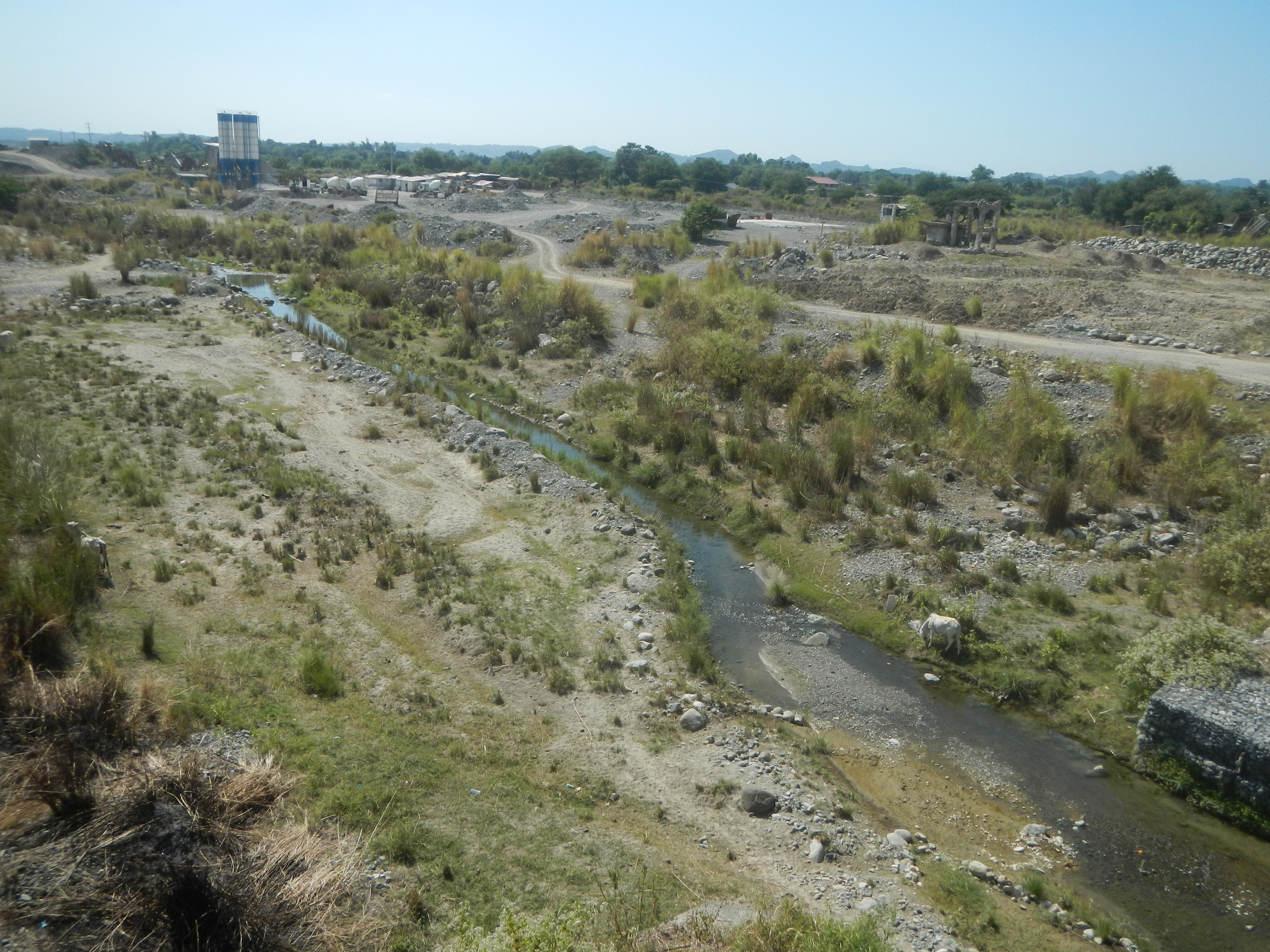
Bued River

The Municipality of Rosario is a coastal town located at the southernmost point of La Union, situated on a narrow plain between the foothills of the Cordillera Central mountain range and the Lingayen Gulf or South China Sea. It spans a land area of 7,312.2725 hectares (73.122 square kilometers), which constitutes 4.93% of La Union’s total land area. Rosario is bordered by several municipalities: Tubao to the north, Santo Tomas to the northwest, Pugo to the east, and Sison (in Barangay Agat) to the southeast, where it meets the Bued River, San Fabian to the southwest along the Rabon River, both in Pangasinan, and the Lingayen Gulf to the west.

The Kennon Road originates in this town and leads to Baguio City. Rosario is accessible via the MacArthur Highway or through the NLEX (North Luzon Expressway), SCTEX (Subic–Clark–Tarlac Expressway), and TPLEX (Tarlac–Pangasinan–La Union Expressway), with the northernmost terminus in Rosario.

Rosario is situated 54.49 kilometres (33.86 mi) from the provincial capital San Fernando, and 213.67 kilometres (132.77 mi) from the country's capital city of Manila.

The flight distance between Manila and Rosario is approximately 189 kilometers (117 miles).

=== Topography ===
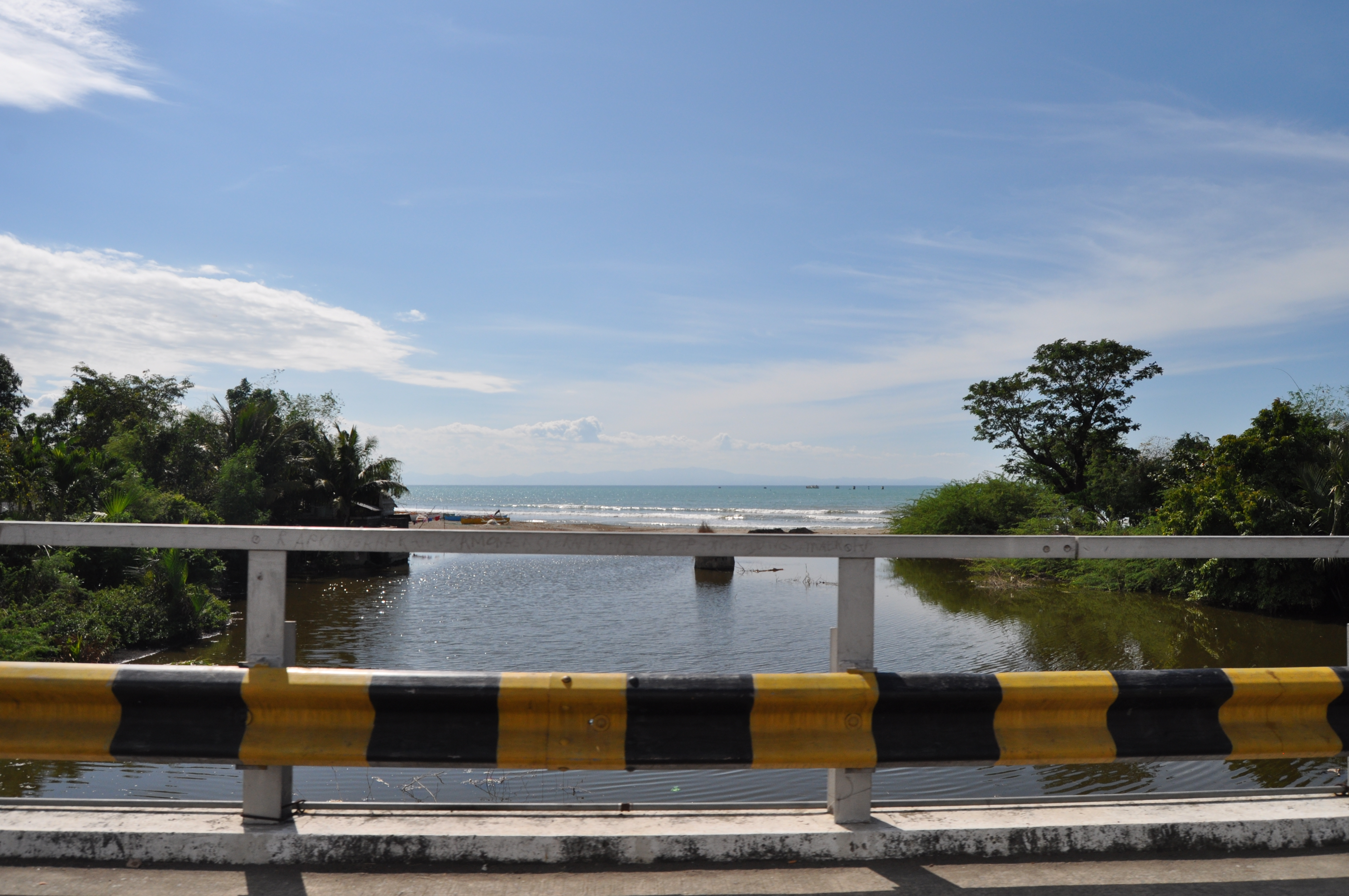
Rabon River

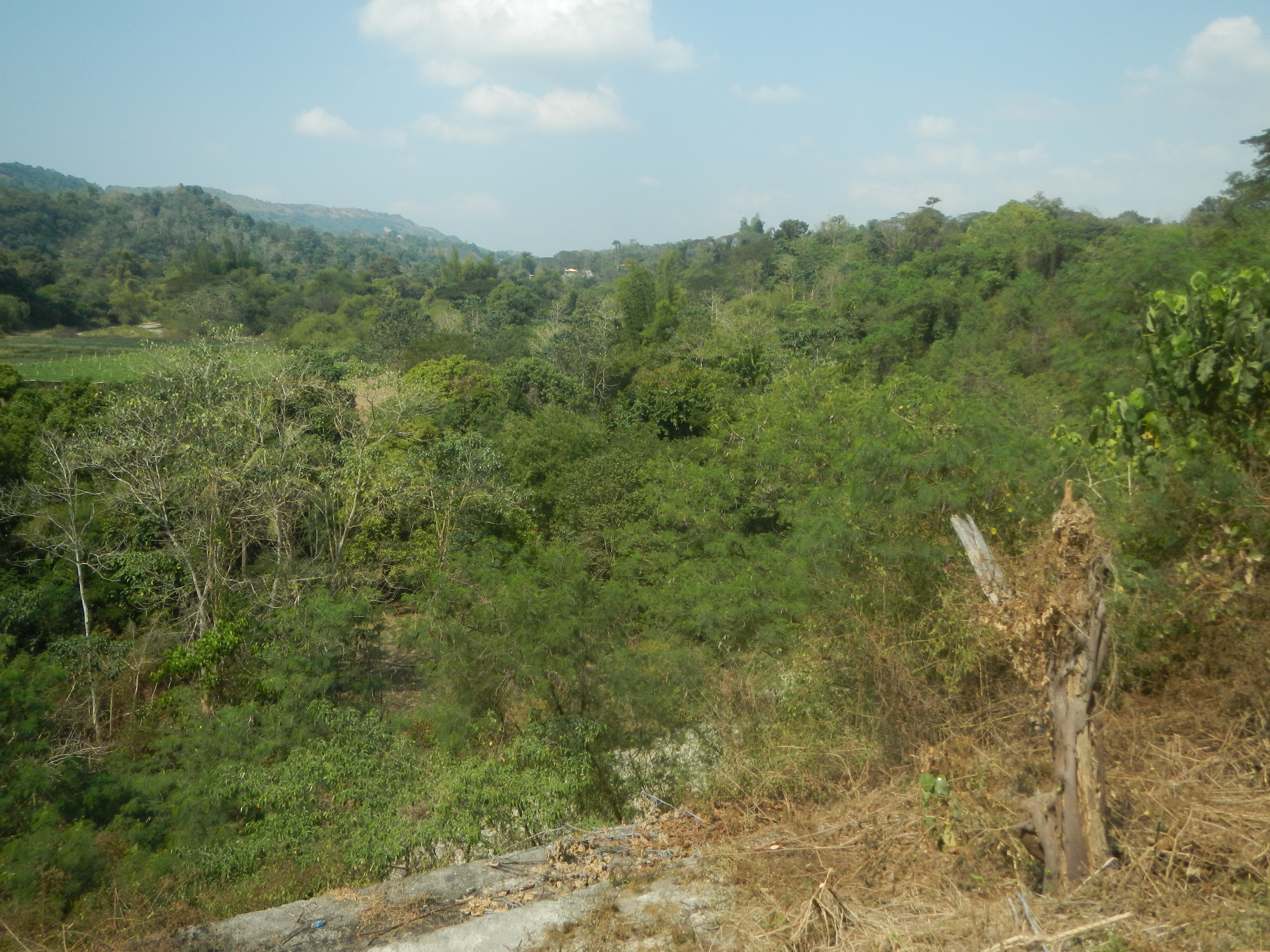
Forest in Inabaan Sur

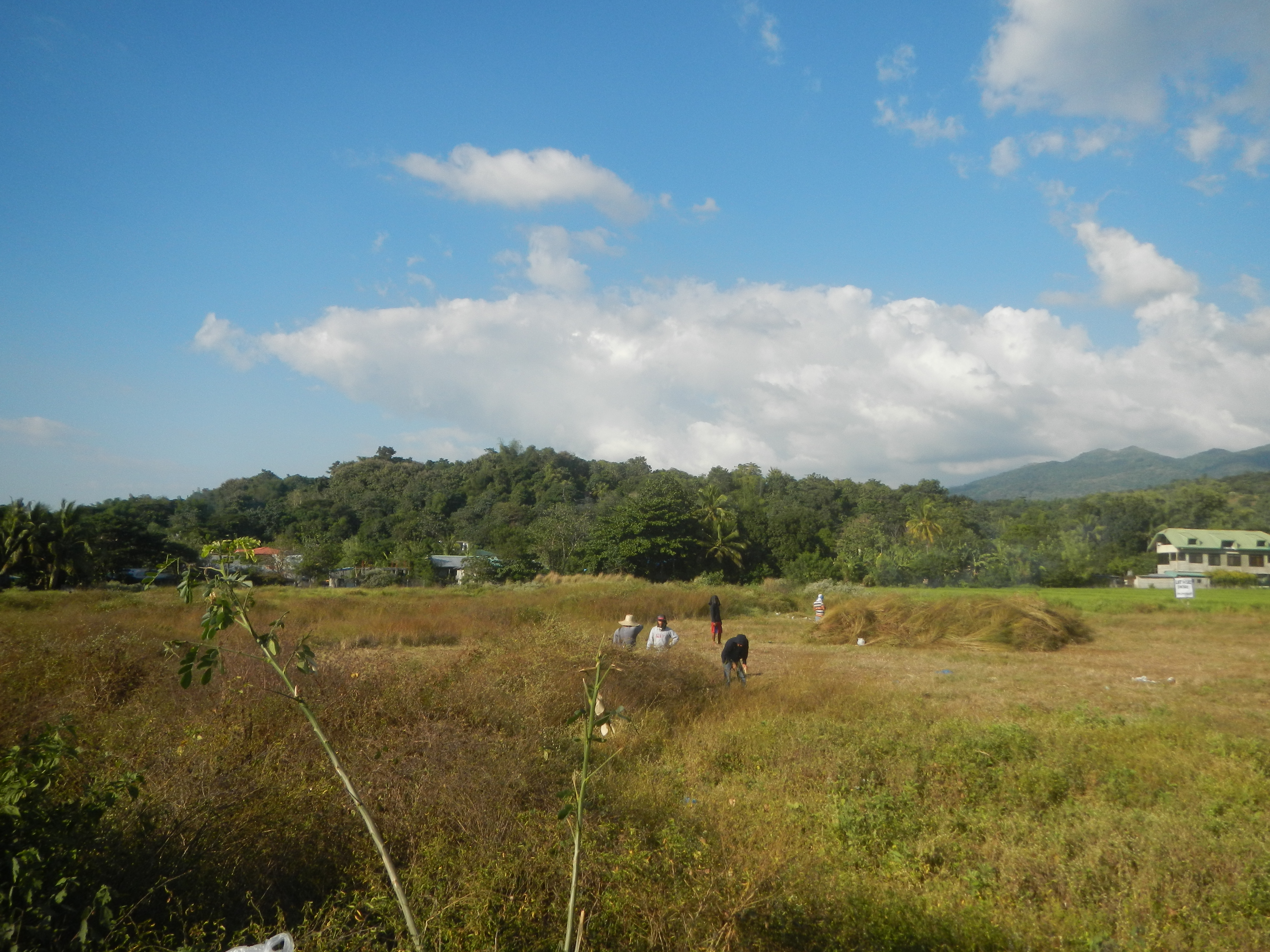
Grassland in Subusub

The topography of Rosario is characterized by a valley with mountainous terrain, predominantly shaped by the sharply sloping mountains of the Cordillera Central range, which runs parallel to the coast of the South China Sea. To the west, the land features narrow plains and valleys, interspersed with shallow rivers and streams. Approximately 8% of the land is level or gently sloping, while 18% is undulating to rolling. Another 30% of the land is rolling to moderately steep, and 50% is steep.

The town is home to a 149.70-hectare forest reserve, which is part of the Don Mariano Marcos Memorial State University (DMMMSU) campus in Barangay Alipang, as well as areas in the barangays of Cadumanian, Casilagan, Cataguingtingan, Inabaan Norte, Marcos, Parasapas, Subusub, and Vila. Rosario is traversed by several rivers, creeks, and brooks, with the three principal rivers being:

- Bued River – flowing through Barangays Bangar, Udiao, and Camp One.
- Malicnao River – flowing through Barangays Alipang, Poblacion East, and Poblacion West.
- Nilangoyan River – flowing southwestward between Barangays Tabtabungao and Cataguingtingan.

Rosario is rich in mineral resources, including metallic deposits of iron magnetic sand in Lingayen Gulf and Barangay Damortis, with an estimated volume of 2,031,400 metric tons. The Bued River has metallic deposits of placer gold, estimated at 816,222 metric tons with 0.30 grams of gold per metric ton. The river is also a major source of sand and gravel, with an estimated volume of 160,000 cubic meters. Other barangays in Rosario are known to have mineral deposits, including lime in Inabaan Norte, coal in both Marcos and Parasapas.

=== Climate ===
Rosario experiences a Type I climate as defined by the Köppen Climate Classification, which features a clear division between wet and dry seasons. The wet season typically starts around mid-May and continues until late October, while the dry season lasts from December through early May. Heavy rainfall is brought by the Southwest Monsoon (SWM) during the wet season, whereas the Northeast Monsoon (NEM) leads to drier conditions as it moves over the Cordillera Mountains.

Climate data for Rosario, La Union
Month	Jan	Feb	Mar	Apr	May	Jun	Jul	Aug	Sep	Oct	Nov	Dec	Year
Mean daily maximum °C (°F)	30 (86)	31 (88)	32 (90)	33 (91)	32 (90)	30 (86)	29 (84)	29 (84)	29 (84)	30 (86)	30 (86)	30 (86)	30 (87)
Mean daily minimum °C (°F)	19 (66)	20 (68)	21 (70)	23 (73)	24 (75)	24 (75)	24 (75)	24 (75)	24 (75)	23 (73)	21 (70)	20 (68)	22 (72)
Average precipitation mm (inches)	15 (0.6)	16 (0.6)	24 (0.9)	33 (1.3)	102 (4.0)	121 (4.8)	177 (7.0)	165 (6.5)	144 (5.7)	170 (6.7)	56 (2.2)	23 (0.9)	1,046 (41.2)
Average rainy days	6.3	6.6	9.5	12.8	20.6	23.5	25.4	23.4	23.2	21.4	14.0	8.2	194.9
Source: Meteoblue

=== Barangays ===
Rosario is politically subdivided into 33 barangays with 30 inland 3 coastal. Each barangay consists of puroks and some have sitios.

- Alipang
- Ambangonan
- Amlang
- Bacani
- Bangar
- Bani
- Benteng-Sapilang
- Cadumanian
- Camp One
- Carunuan East
- Carunuan West
- Casilagan
- Cataguingtingan
- Concepcion
- Damortis
- Gumot-Nagcolaran
- Inabaan Norte
- Inabaan Sur
- Marcos
- Nagtagaan
- Nangcamotian
- Parasapas
- Poblacion East
- Poblacion West
- Puzon
- Rabon
- San Jose
- Subusub
- Tabtabungao
- Tanglag
- Tay-ac
- Udiao
- Vila

== Demographics ==
Rosario, La Union's population in 2020 stood at 60,278 as according to Census of Population and Housing marking an increase of 4,820 people compared to 2015. The town has seen a steady rise, with an average annual population growth rate (PGR) of 1.77%, meaning approximately 18 people are added per year for every 1,000 residents. This growth rate suggests that, if sustained, the population could double in the next 40 years. In comparison, the population 60 years ago in 1960 was just 18,045, indicating significant growth over the decades.

Population census of Rosario
Year	Pop.	±% p.a.
1903	3,028	—
1918	6,806	+5.55%
1939	11,280	+2.44%
1948	12,869	+1.48%
1960	18,045	+2.86%
1970	22,118	+2.05%
1975	25,354	+2.78%
1980	29,331	+2.96%
1990	35,010	+1.79%
1995	38,376	+1.73%
2000	43,497	+2.72%
2007	49,025	+1.66%
2010	52,679	+2.65%
2015	55,458	+0.98%
2020	60,278	+1.77%
2024	58,797	−0.60%
Source: Philippine Statistics Authority

=== Population by Barangays ===
Among the 33 barangays in Rosario, Concepcion had the largest population, comprising 6.36% of the total municipal population, followed by Tabtabungao (5.40%), Camp One (5.38%), Subusub (4.92%), and Tay-ac (4.78%). Other populous barangays included Cataguingtingan (4.73%), Damortis (4.26%), Udiao (4.24%), Poblacion East (4.13%), and Amlang (3.92%). The remaining barangays each contributed less than 3.50%. The least populated barangay in 2020 was San Jose, with only 1.14%, while in 2015, Ambangonan had the smallest share at 1.05%.

=== Sex Ratio ===
The municipality’s sex ratio in 2020 remained balanced at 102 males for every 100 females. Males made up 50.48% of the total population, while females accounted for 49.52%. This indicates a slight male majority, a common trend in many populations, though the gender distribution is nearly equal.

=== Median Age ===
The median age of the population in 2020 was 27.02 years, an increase from 25.62 years in 2015. This suggests that the population is aging slowly, with a significant portion of the population being relatively young. Children aged 10–14 years made up the largest age group (9.98%), followed by those aged 5–9 years (9.76%) and 15–19 years (9.32%). The age structure reveals a youthful population with a growing number of young dependents.

=== Dependency Ratio ===
Rosario’s dependency ratio stood at 55 in 2020, which means that for every 100 working-age individuals (ages 15–64), there are 55 dependents—44 young dependents (ages 0–14) and 11 old dependents (ages 65 and over). This represents a slight improvement from 2015, when the ratio was 58. A lower dependency ratio indicates that a larger proportion of the population is of working age, which could help boost economic productivity.

=== Marital Status ===
Among individuals aged 10 years and older, 40.41% were married, while 38.40% had never married. A significant portion of the population (13.84%) was in common-law or live-in relationships, reflecting changing social norms. Notably, more males (54.20%) than females (45.80%) were classified as never married, suggesting different patterns in marital trends between genders.

=== Household Size ===
In 2020, the municipality had a total of 60,203 people living in 14,433 households. The average household size remained steady at 4.2 persons, reflecting a slight increase from 2015. This suggests that while the population is growing, household sizes have not decreased significantly, pointing to continued family-based living structures.

=== Birth Registration ===
Birth registration in Rosario was almost universal, with 99.41% of the population having their births officially recorded. Of those with registered births, 50.49% were male and 49.51% were female, maintaining the general population's sex ratio. High birth registration rates indicate effective civic engagement and administrative systems in the region.

=== Voting Population ===
In the 2022 elections, the municipality has 36,528 registered voters. The voting-age population (18 years and older) represented 65.65% of the total population in 2020, an increase from 63.55% in 2015. This means that the majority of residents are eligible to vote, with more females (50.16%) than males (49.84%) in the voting-age group. This demographic shift may have implications for political engagement and representation in future elections.

=== Ethnicity and language ===
The majority of Rosario's population belongs to the Ilocano ethnolinguistic group, making Iloco the predominant language spoken in the municipality. Smaller populations include Pangasinans, Tagalogs, and indigenous groups such as the Bago and Ibaloi. In addition to Iloco, Filipino and English are widely used for communication and as mediums of instruction, reflecting the linguistic diversity of the area.

=== Religion ===
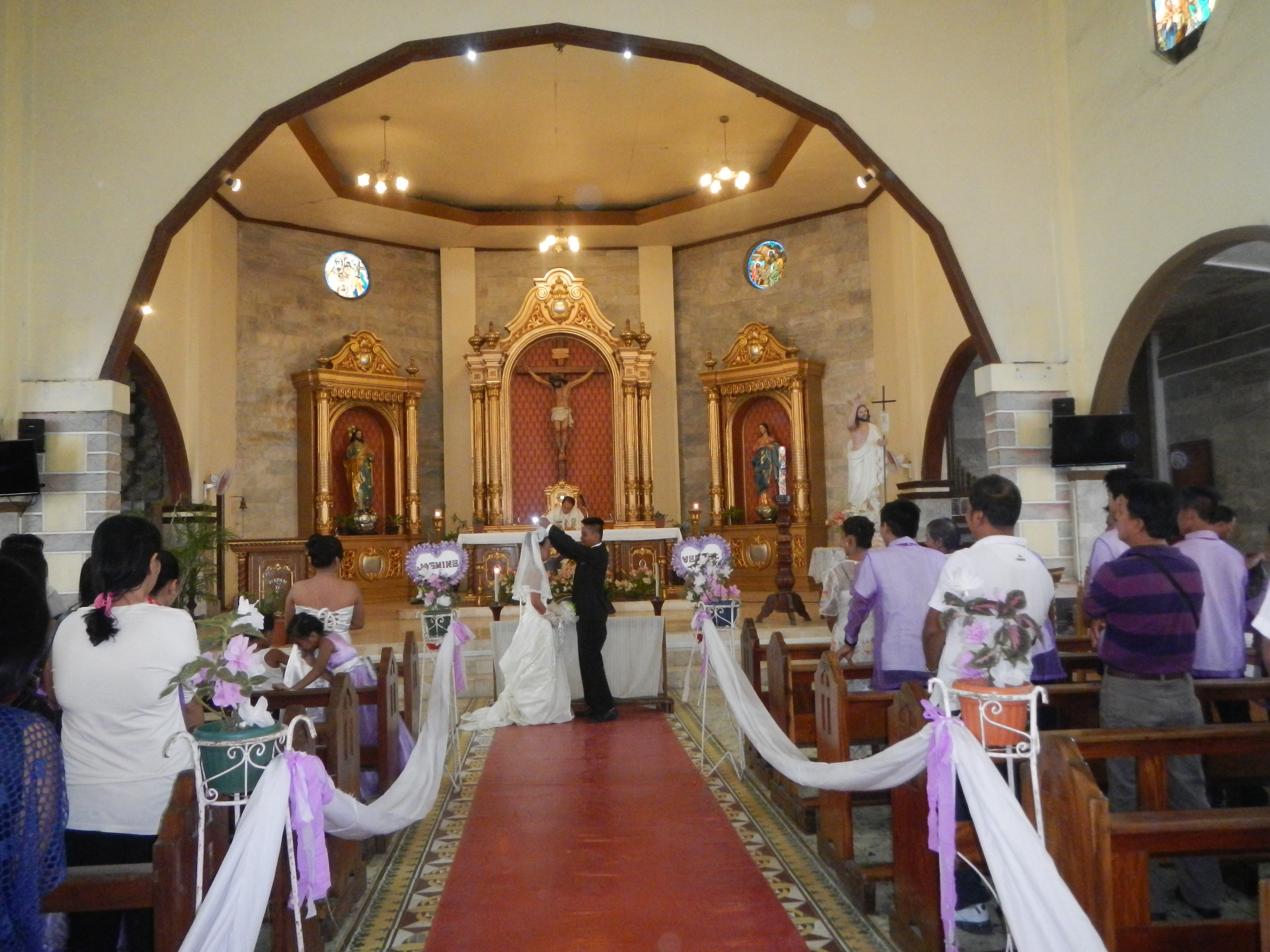
Wedding at Immaculate Conception Parish Church

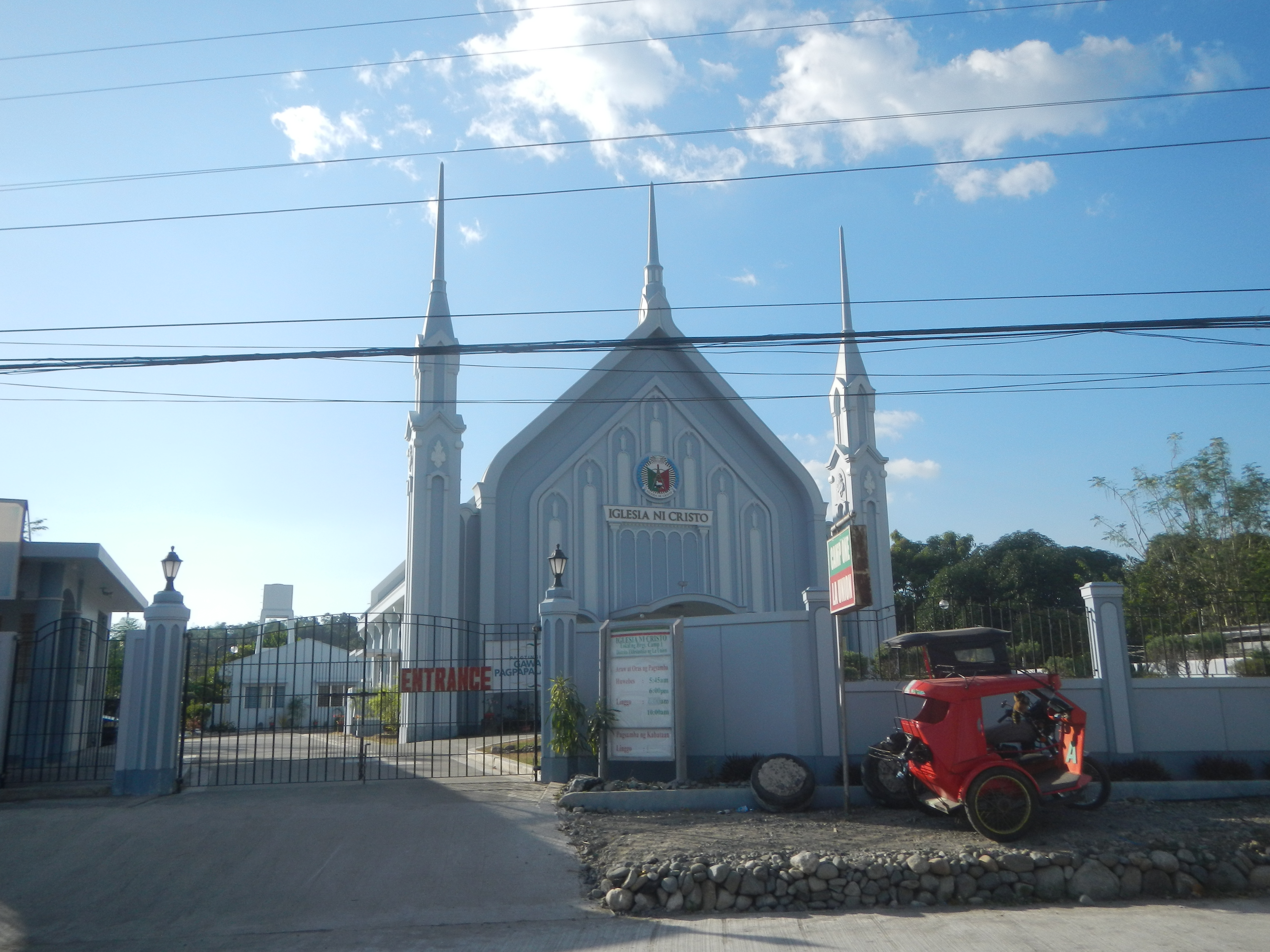
Iglesia ni Cristo

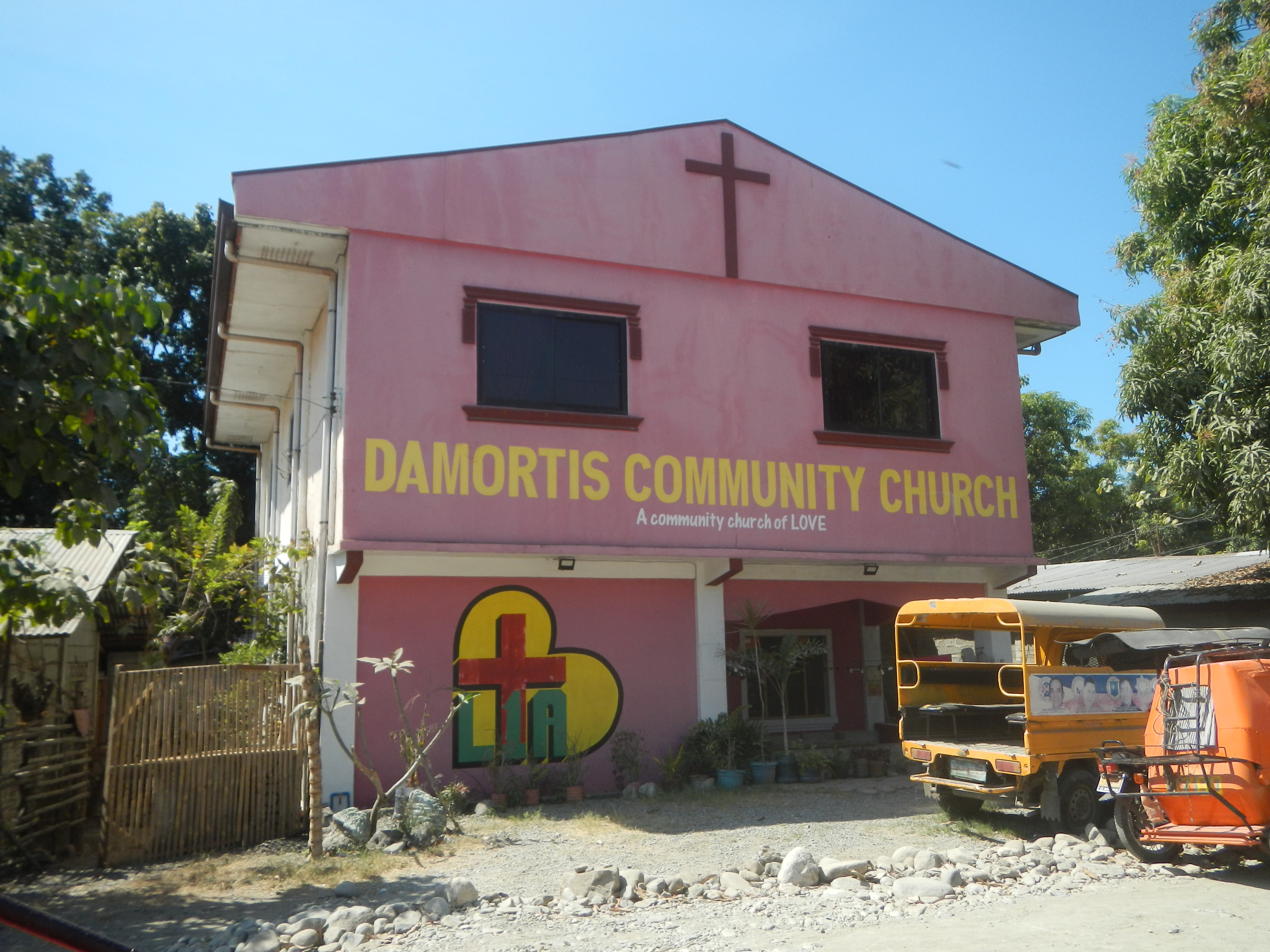
Community Church in Damortis

Rosario is predominantly Roman Catholic, with a large portion of the population adhering to this faith. Significant numbers of residents also belong to various Christian denominations, including the Church of Christ, Iglesia Ni Cristo, Church of Jesus Christ of Latter-day Saints, Evangelicals, United Church of Christ in the Philippines, National Council of Churches in the Philippines, Bible Baptist Church, Jehovah’s Witnesses, United Pentecostal Church, Jesus is Lord Church, and the Evangelical Christian Outreach Foundation. Additionally, smaller groups follow Islam and the Union Espiritista Cristiana de Filipinas Inc., reflecting the religious diversity within the municipality.

== Education ==
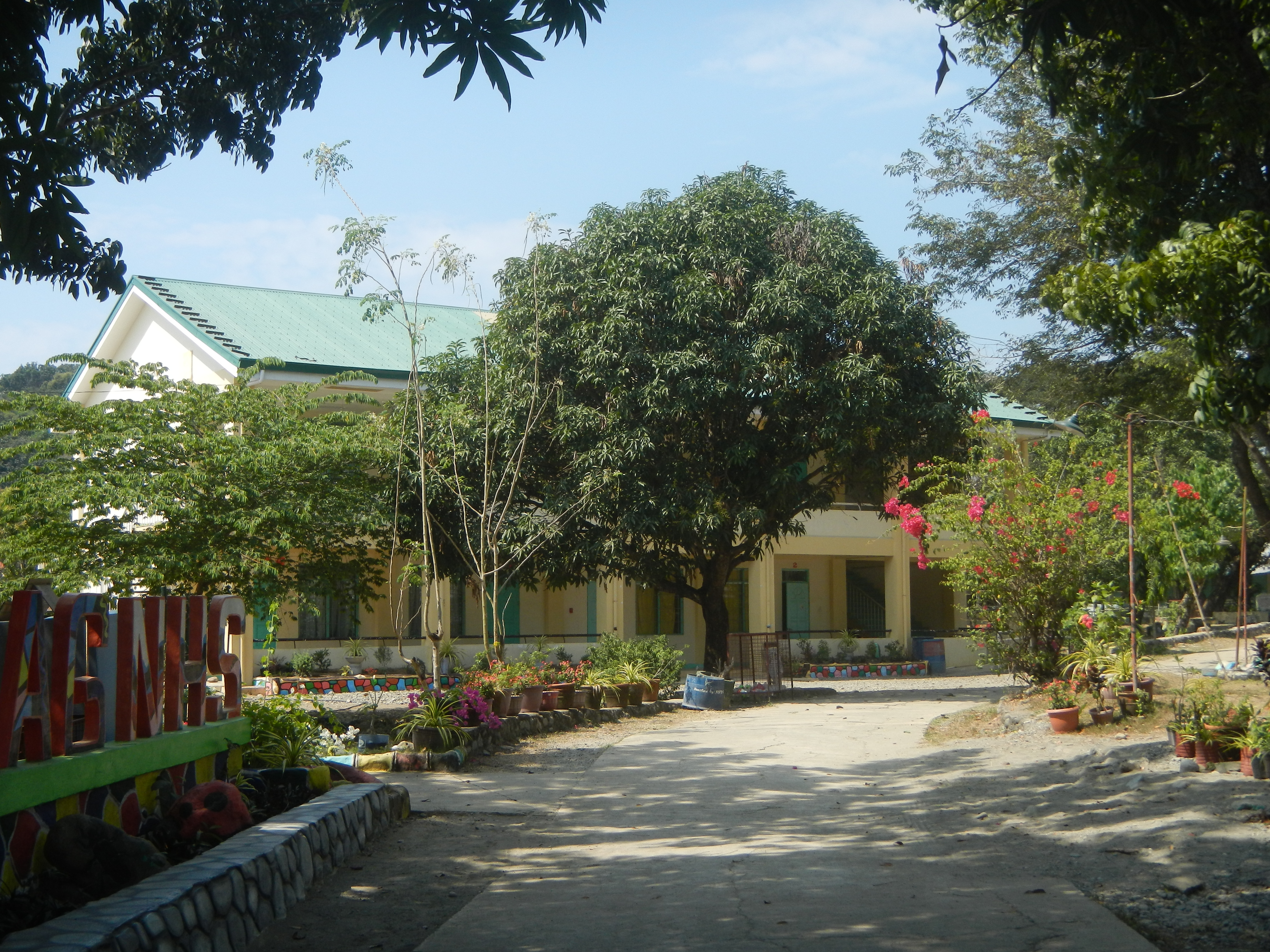
Tanglag National High School

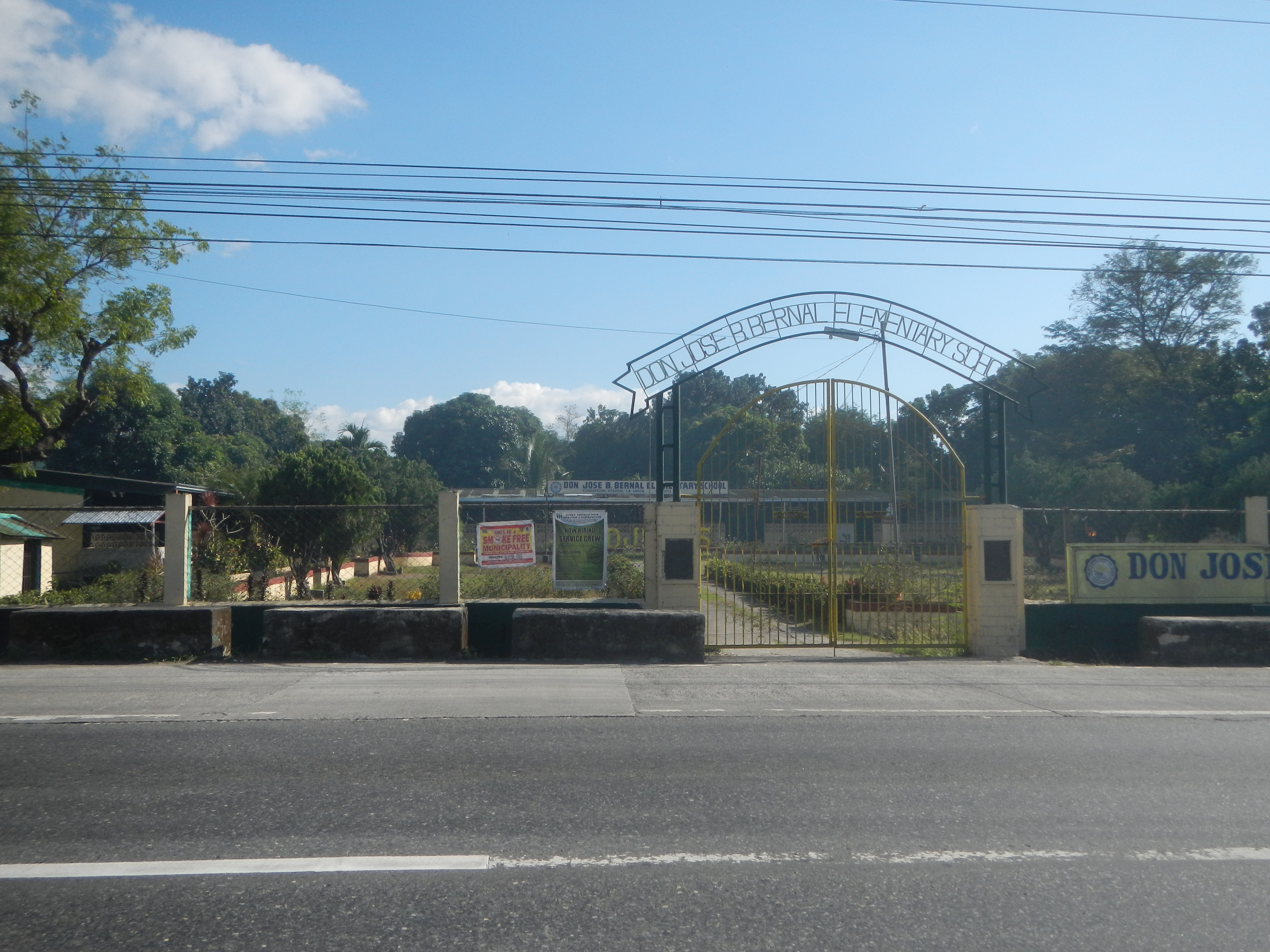
Don Jose B. Bernal Elementary School

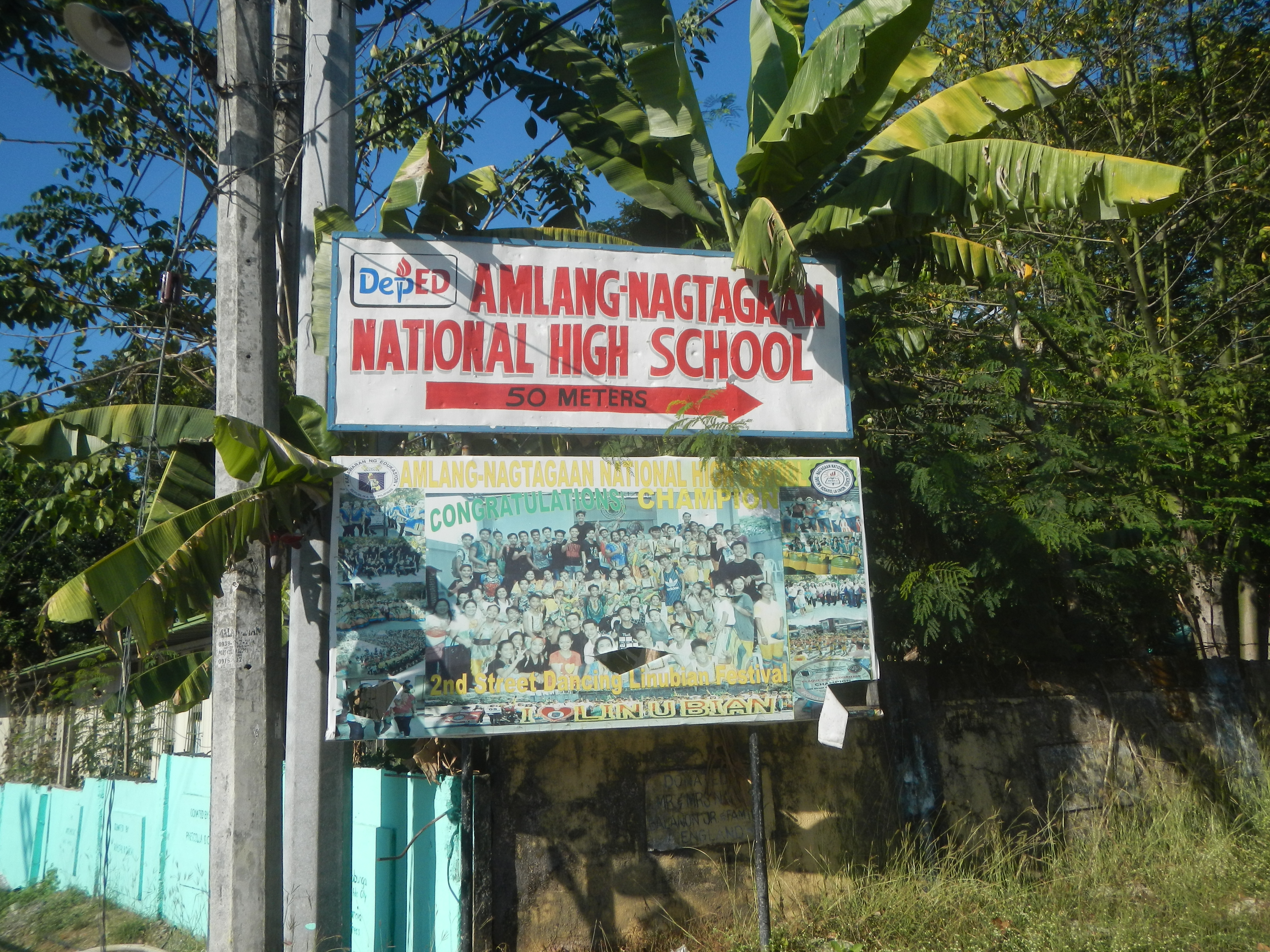
Amlang-Nagtagaan National High Schooll

The Rosario Schools District Office governs all educational institutions within the municipality. It oversees the management and operations of all private and public elementary and high schools.

In terms of education, females outpaced males in higher educational attainment. Among those aged five and over, 25.04% completed elementary education, 43.68% finished high school, and 13.05% held an academic degree. Additionally, 9.58% were college undergraduates. Of those with academic degrees, 57.37% were female, highlighting gender disparities in higher education, with more women completing tertiary education.

The literacy rate in Rosario was a high 99.26%, with males (50.27%) slightly outperforming females (49.73%). This near-universal literacy rate is indicative of strong educational initiatives and access to education across the municipality.

Rosario has 16 public elementary schools, 6 public secondary schools and 1 College under the Don Mariano Marcos Memorial State University-South La Union Campus.

=== Primary and elementary schools ===
- Achievers Haven Learning School
- Amlang Elementary School
- Bani Elementary School
- Cadumanian Elementary School
- Carunoan Elementary School
- Casilagan Elementary School
- Cataguingtingan Elementary School
- Don Jose B. Bernal Elementary School
- Gumot Elementary School
- Harvester Bible Baptist Theological College & Academy
- Inabaan Elementary School
- Marcos Elementary School
- Parasapas Elementary School
- Sapilang Elementary School
- St. Mary's Academy
- Tanglag Elementary School
- UCCP Nursery Kindergarten
- Udiao Elementary School
- Vila Elementary School

=== Secondary schools ===
- Amlang-Nagtagaan National High School
- Alipang National High School
- Parasapas National High School
- Rosario Integrated School
- Tanglag National High School

=== Higher educational institutions ===
- Don Mariano Marcos Memorial State University
- La Union Christian Comprehensive College

== Economy ==
Poverty incidence of Rosario (%)

Source: Philippine Statistics Authority

Rosario is a 1st class municipality in terms of income, effective since July 29, 2008, as per Memorandum Circular 01- No. M(40)-08 issued on November 12, 2008, by the Bureau of Local Government Finance. The municipality has a poverty incidence rate of 10.67% as of 2021. In 2020, the revenue of Rosario was ₱261.7 million, while its assets amounted to ₱522.2 million. The municipality's expenditure for the same year was ₱175.3 million, and its liabilities stood at ₱141.4 million.

Over the past three years, Rosario's average annual income has been ₱334,279,452.80 from the General Fund and ₱6,377,559.53 from the Special Education Fund. The total estimated Internal Revenue Allotment (IRA) for the municipality in the calendar year 2022 was ₱227,487,888.00, which was also the actual IRA received for 2022.

=== Agriculture ===
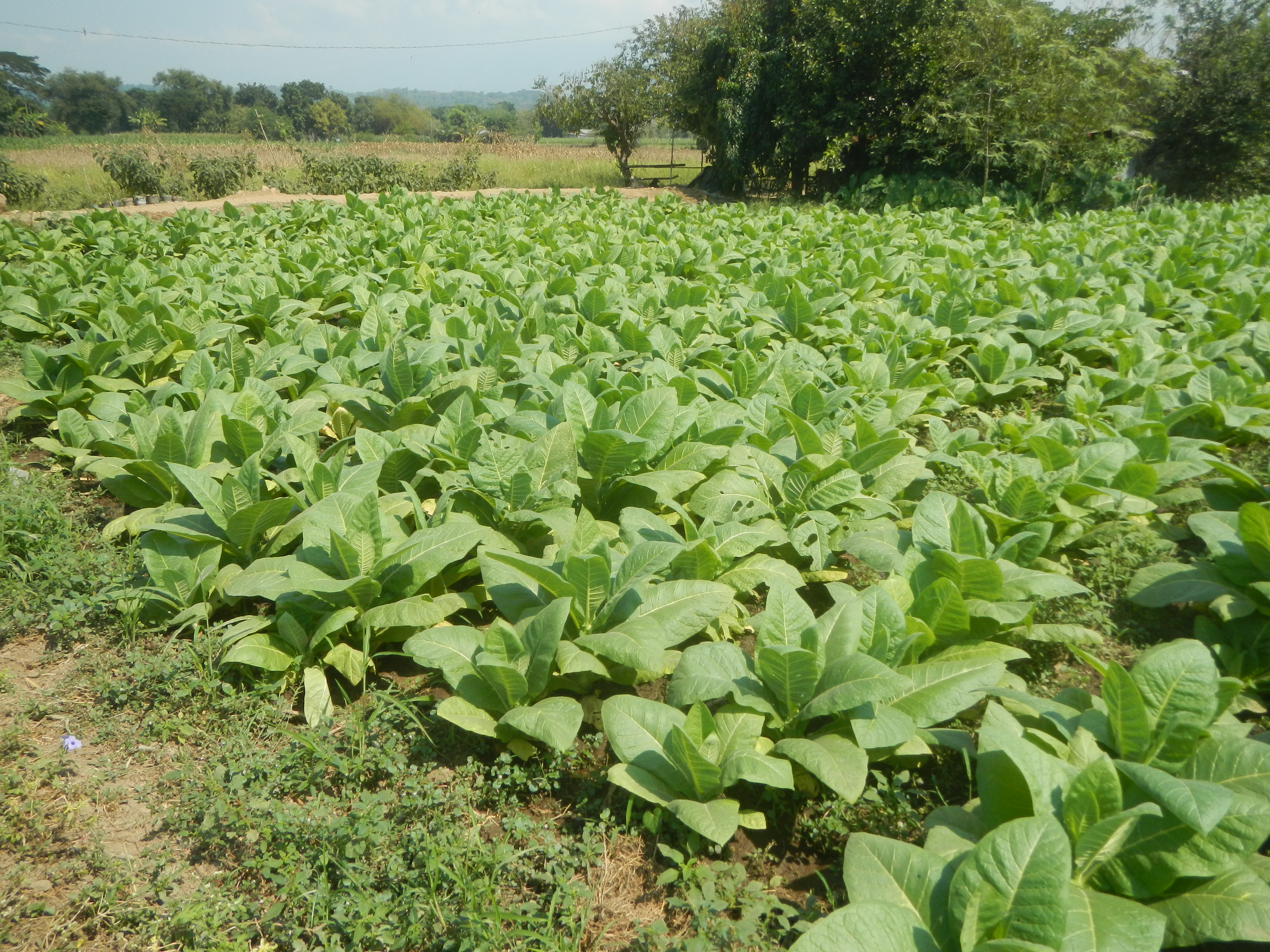
Tobacco in Tabtabungao

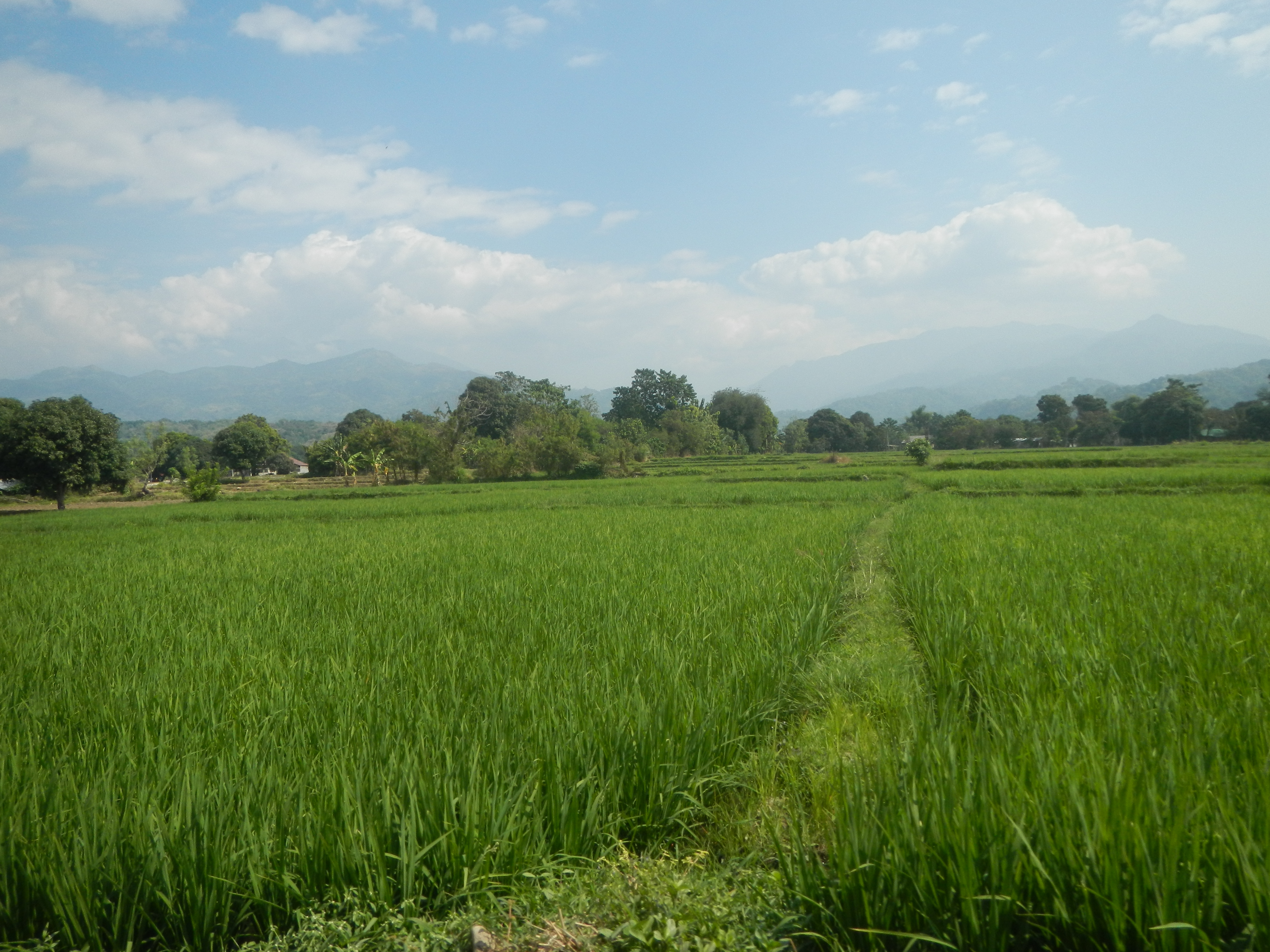
Paddy fields in Tay-ac

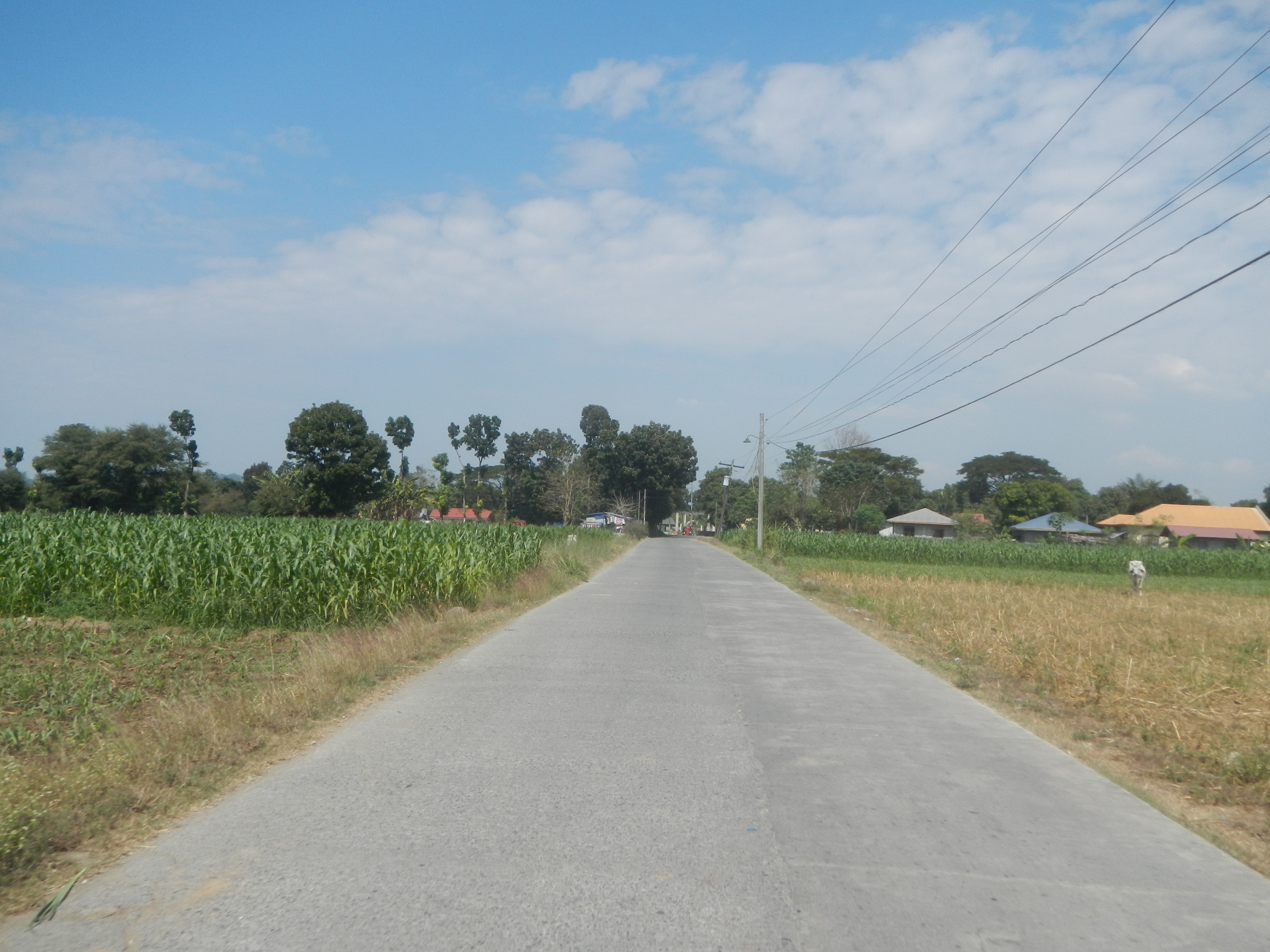
Maize field in Tabtabungao

Rosario is primarily an agricultural municipality, with a land area of 1,422 hectares. The major crops grown in the area include rice, corn, peanuts, tobacco, as well as various fruits such as mango, banana, and papaya, and vegetables like tomato, ampalaya (bitter melon), okra, eggplant, string beans, and root crops such as cassava, sweet potatoes, and tugui.

The municipality benefits from five major irrigation systems, including the Bued I Communal Irrigation System, Bued II Communal Irrigation System, Malicnao Irrigation System, Campa Irrigation System, and the non-functional Apangat Irrigation System. The Bued Communal Irrigation System (CIS II) received international funding support in 1998 from the Agrarian Reform Infrastructure Support Project (ARISP) through the government of Japan, which directly benefited the PUSUNANGTATAY Agrarian Reform Community (ARC) encompassing six clustered barangays: Puzon, Udiao, Subusub, Nangcamotian, Tabtabungao, and Tay-ac.

=== Livestock ===
Livestock farming is a vital component of Rosario’s economy, supporting livelihoods and food security for many residents. As of 2022, the municipality’s livestock population includes 1,114 carabaos used for farm labor and milk production, 1,328 cattle raised for meat and dairy, and 5,187 goats providing milk and meat. The poultry industry thrives with 146,556 commercial poultry, 23,500 commercial layers producing eggs, and 20,422 native poultry raised in backyard farms. Swine production contributes significantly with 1,095 hogs raised for meat.

=== Fishing ===
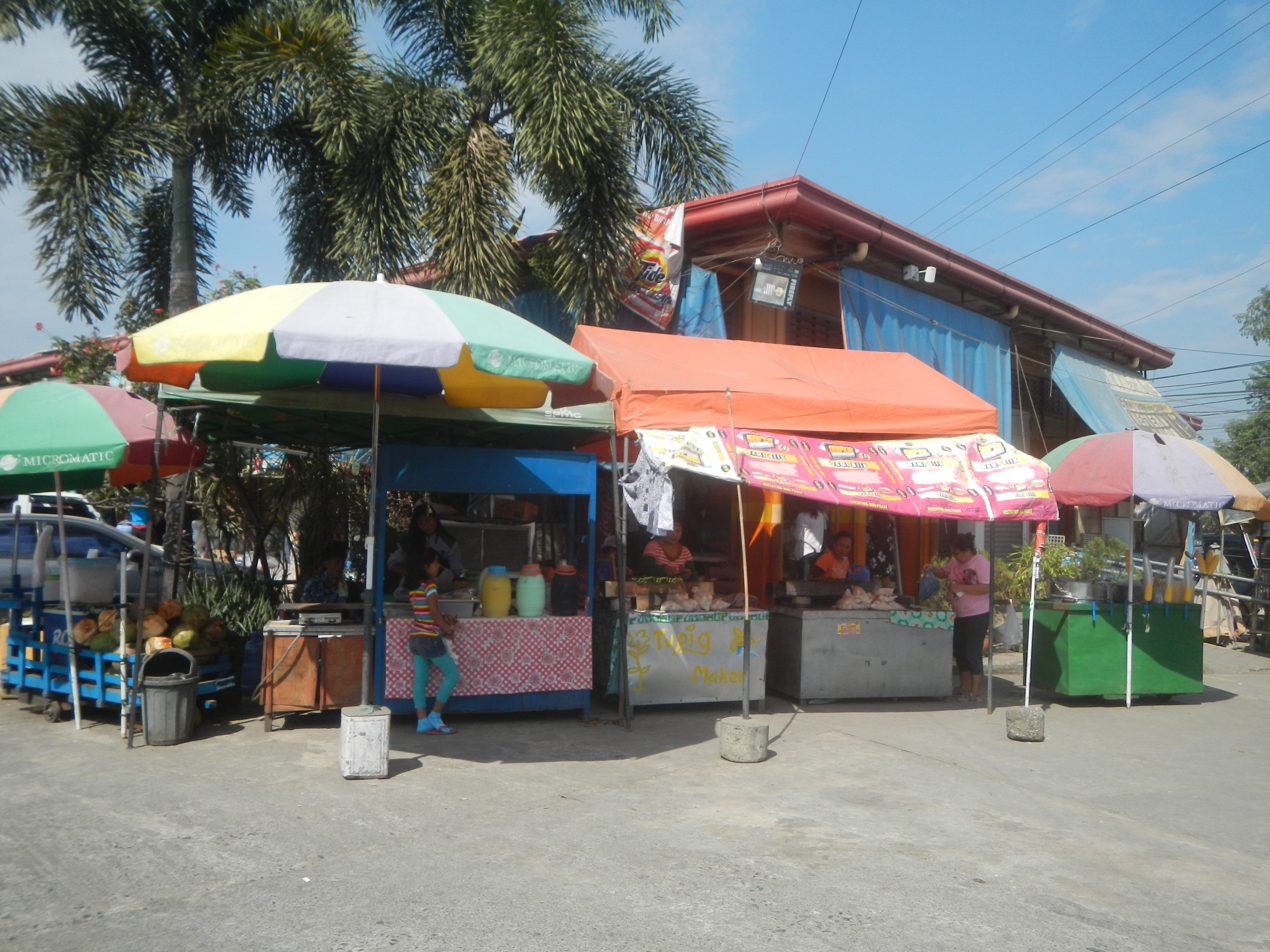
Public Market

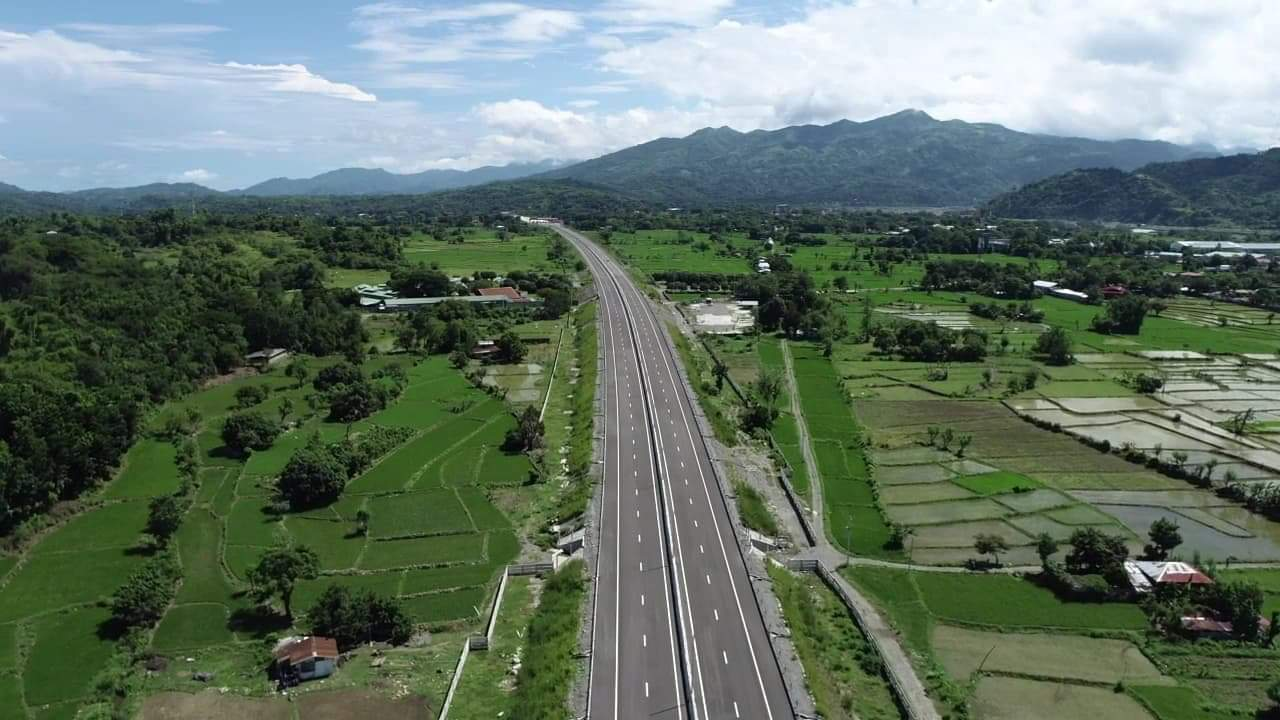
TPLEX in Rosario

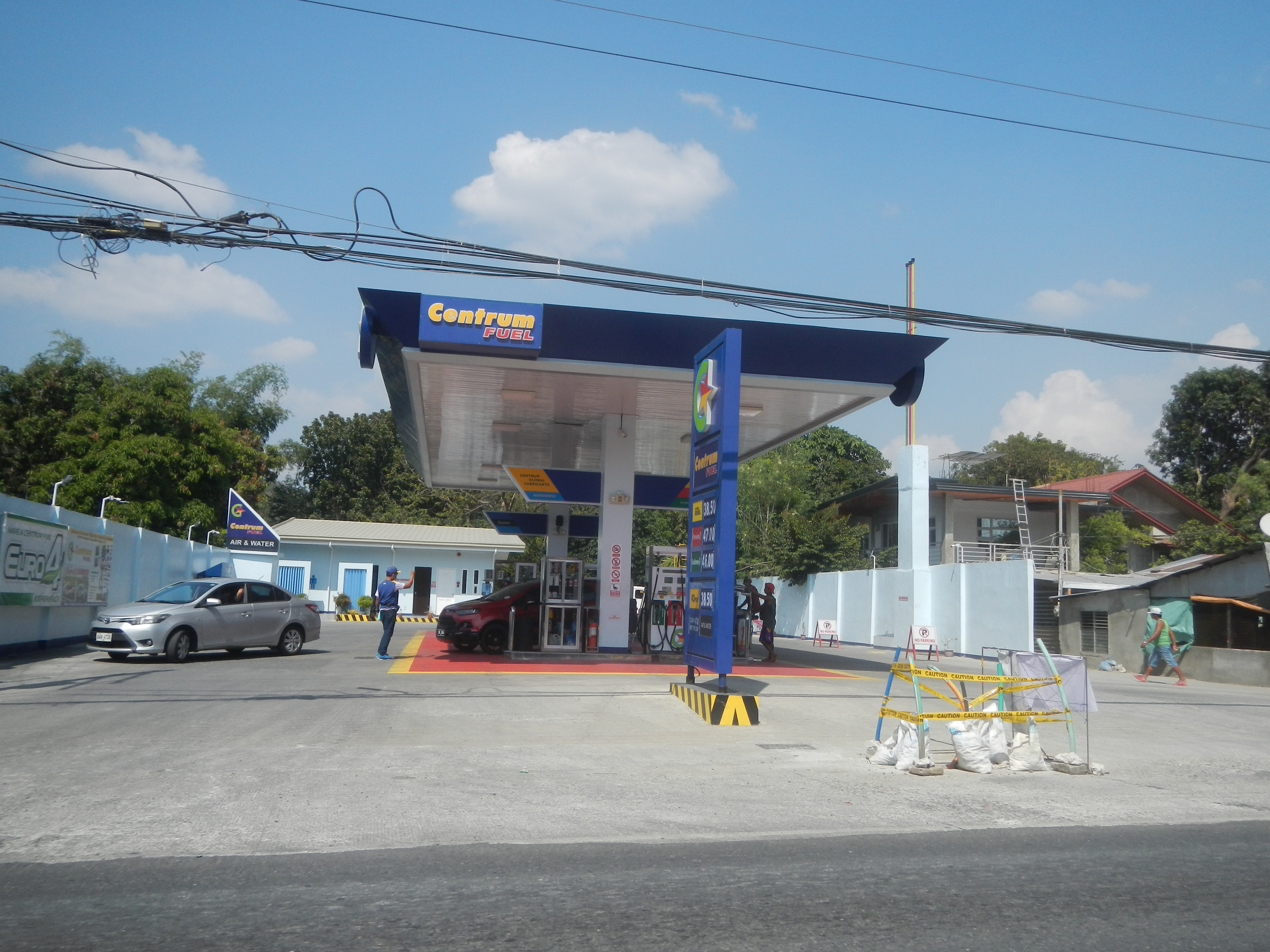
Business Establishment

In terms of fisheries and aquaculture, Rosario has a freshwater fishpond area of 4.841 hectares, producing 13.654 metric tons. The municipality also has a communal water area of 65.00 hectares, producing 78.00 metric tons with a productivity rate of 1.20 metric tons per hectare. The municipality has 128 motorized bancas involved in municipal fishing, which produce 320 metric tons with a productivity rate of 2.50 metric tons per banca, and 72 non-motorized bancas producing 86.40 metric tons with a productivity rate of 1.20 metric tons per banca.

=== Commerce & Industry ===
The Rosario Public Market is located in Barangay Subusub along McArthur Highway, occupying a total area of 9,781 square meters. It consists of six existing buildings, five additional buildings for ambulant vendors, and two newly constructed buildings along the National Highway. The municipality has also designated areas for non-polluting light industries, particularly in the barangays of Rabon, Bani, and Damortis (RaBaDam), which are situated along the Lingayen Gulf, and in Barangays Tabtabungao and Udiao. These areas are part of the local efforts to encourage industrial development that aligns with the municipality's environmental goals.

=== Tourism ===
Rosario's tourism potential is significant, with its diverse landscapes of mountains, rolling hills, valleys, and beaches providing ample opportunities for development.

Eco-tourism sites in the municipality include Rocapor Farm, where visitors can enjoy organic fruit and vegetable picking, nature appreciation, picnics, and animal feeding. Vaughn’s Eco Farm offers tractor rides, nature appreciation, and picnic spots, while Albay Carabao Farm provides an opportunity for visitors to feed high-bred carabaos, harvest Napier grass, and experience manual milking. Luna Cacao Farm offers nature tours, cacao planting and harvesting activities, and animal feeding experiences, while Mount Kawawingan is a popular hiking and trekking destination known for its "Sea of Clouds," wild fruit picking, and picnicking opportunities. These initiatives highlight the municipality's commitment to sustainable agriculture, aquaculture, and tourism development, contributing to economic growth.

== Government ==
=== Local government ===
Just as the national government, the municipal government of Rosario, is divided into three branches: executive, legislative, and judiciary. The judicial branch is administered solely by the Supreme Court of the Philippines. The LGUs have control of the executive and legislative branches.

The executive branch is composed of the mayor and the barangay captain for the barangays.

The legislative branch is composed of the Sangguniang Bayan (town assembly), Sangguniang Barangay (barangay council), and the Sangguniang Kabataan for the youth sector.

The seat of Government is vested upon the Mayor and other elected officers who hold office at the RosarioTown hall. The Sangguniang Bayan is the center of legislation, stationed in Rosario Legislative Building or Town hall.

=== Elected officials ===
Members of the Municipal Council (2025–2028)
Position	Name
Congressman	Dante Sotelo Garcia
Mayor	Bellarmin "Larry" A. Flores II
Vice-Mayor	Bellarmin "Red" C. Flores III
Councilors	Edita Meneses
Councilors	Florante B. Zarate
Councilors	Allan S. Sabangan
Councilors	Joseph "Labang" Heruela
Councilors	Raul "989" C. Flores
Councilors	Grace G. Viray
Councilors	Rose Lily S. Fuentes
Councilors	Ronald Rapada

== Tourism ==
Rosario has the following landmark attractions:

- Beach resorts
- Zoo
- The Queen of Peace Priory
- The Tree House
- World War II Vintage Canons located at the Town Plaza
- The Rosario Nature Park is hectares of lush green (La Union’s biggest camping site. It is the venue of the Boy and Girl Scouts of the Philippines' Jamborees. It is also the meeting place of Air Soft Enthusiasts' War Games.
- Agoo–Damortis Protected Landscape and Seascape
- Public Market (near the Rosario-Pugo Junction Road and a new Slaughter House which, unlike its predecessor, was built away from residential areas.
- Yearly, on December 8, the Feast of Immaculate Concepcion, the town celebrates its fiesta. But it centers on the Linubian Festival (local cassava and banana cake) held from April 17 to 19. Rosario holds an Agri Trade Fair, showcasing its harvests topped by street-dancing competitions.

Gallery

=== 1869 Immaculate Concepcion Parish Church ===
The Immaculate Concepcion Parish Church was canonically erected in 1869. It is under the jurisdiction of the Diocese of San Fernando de La Union (Dioecesis Ferdinandopolitana ab Unione, Suffragan of Lingayen – Dagupan, which was created on January 19, 1970, and erected on April 11, 1970, comprising the Civil Province of La Union, under the Titular, St. William the Hermit, February 10). The church is under a diocese of the Latin Catholic Church in the Philippines from the Archdiocese of Nueva Segovia.

The Rosario Church is under the Vicariate of St. Francis Xavier with Vicar Forane, Fr. Joel Angelo Licos. Its Parish Priestis Fr. Raul S. Panay.

The church is located on the eastern side fronting the National Highway and the Municipal Building. It has an access road to the Rosario-Pugo-Baguio Road.

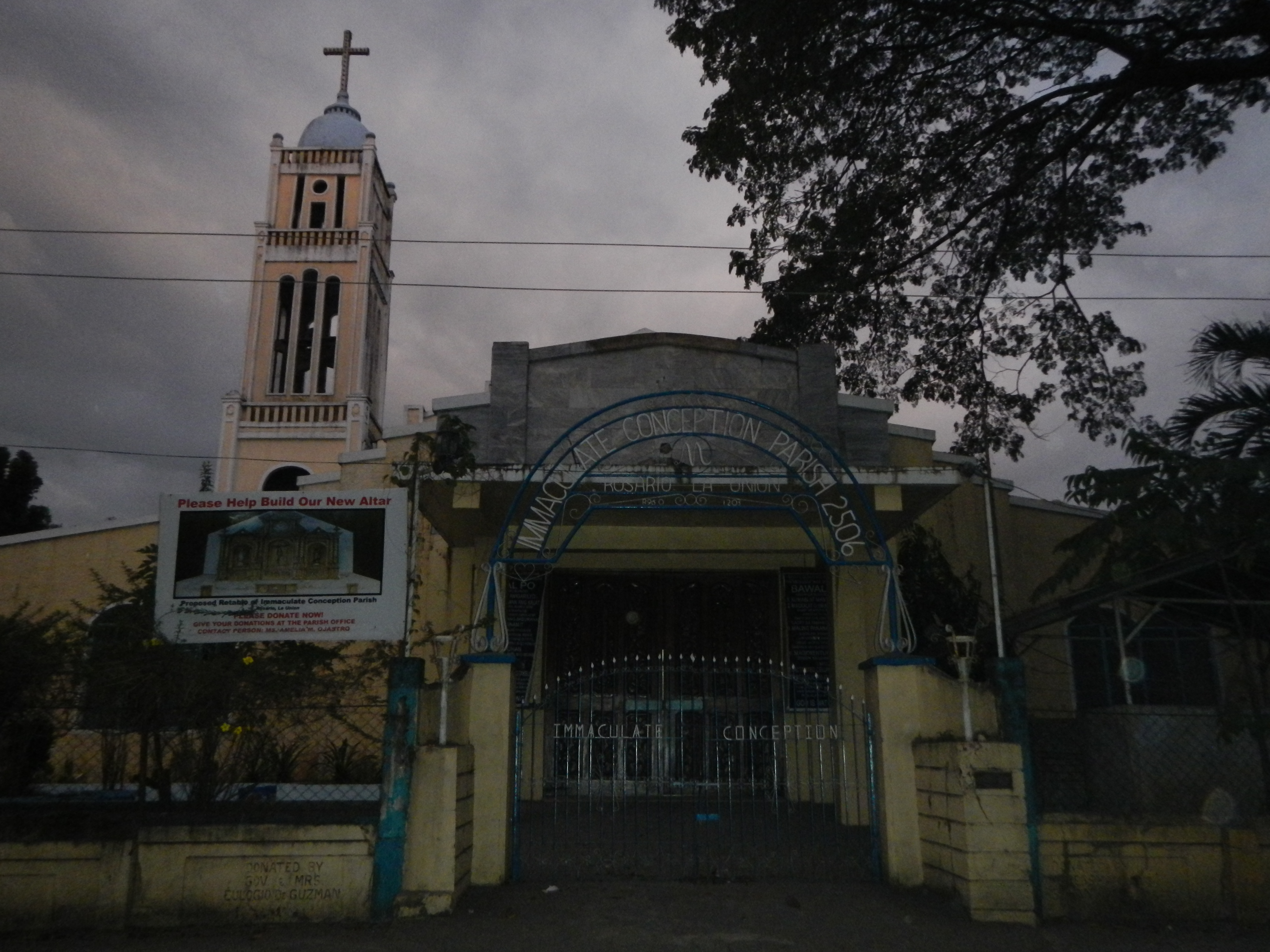
Church gate

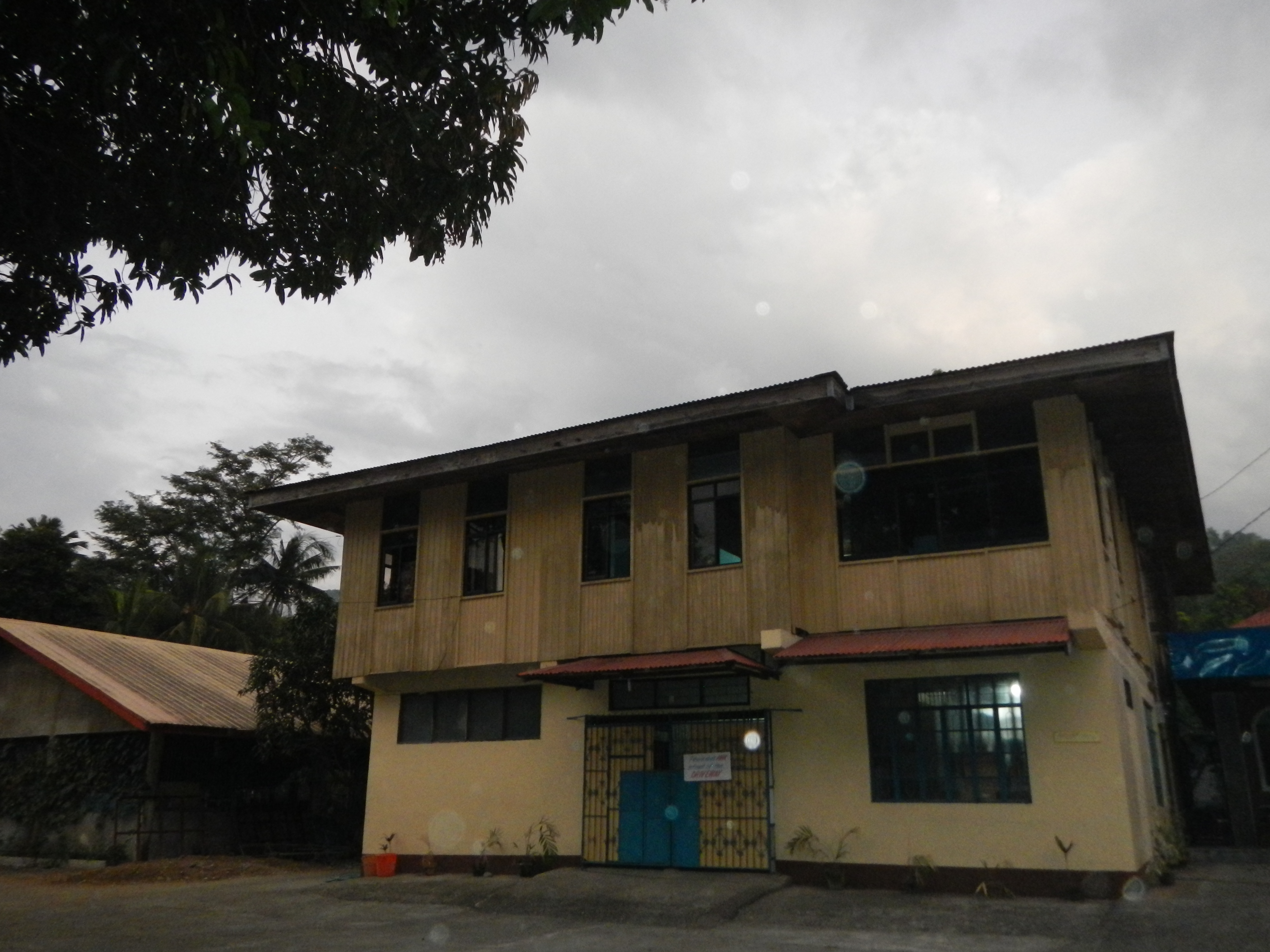
Convent and Parish rectory

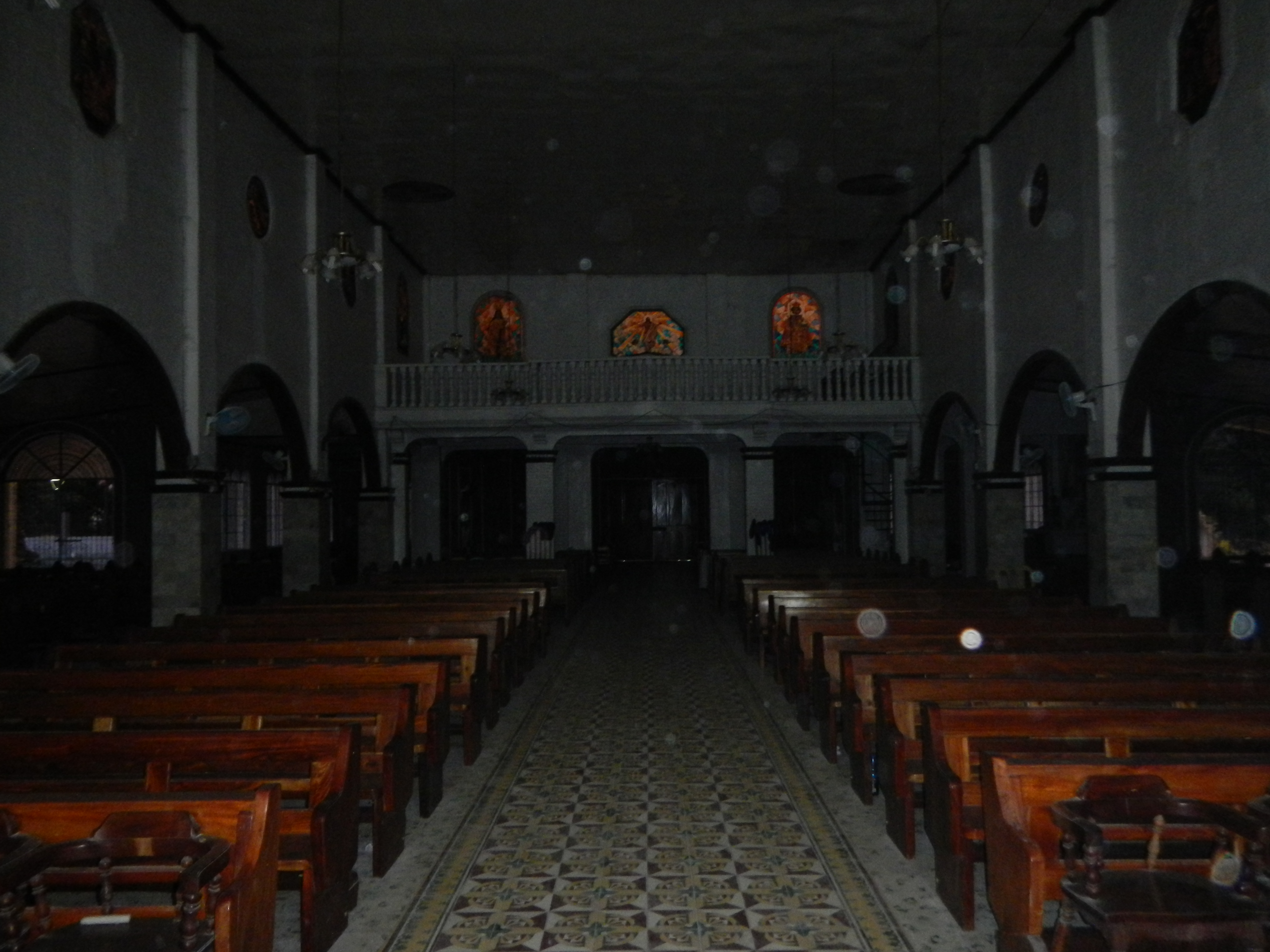
Interior and choir

== Gallery ==
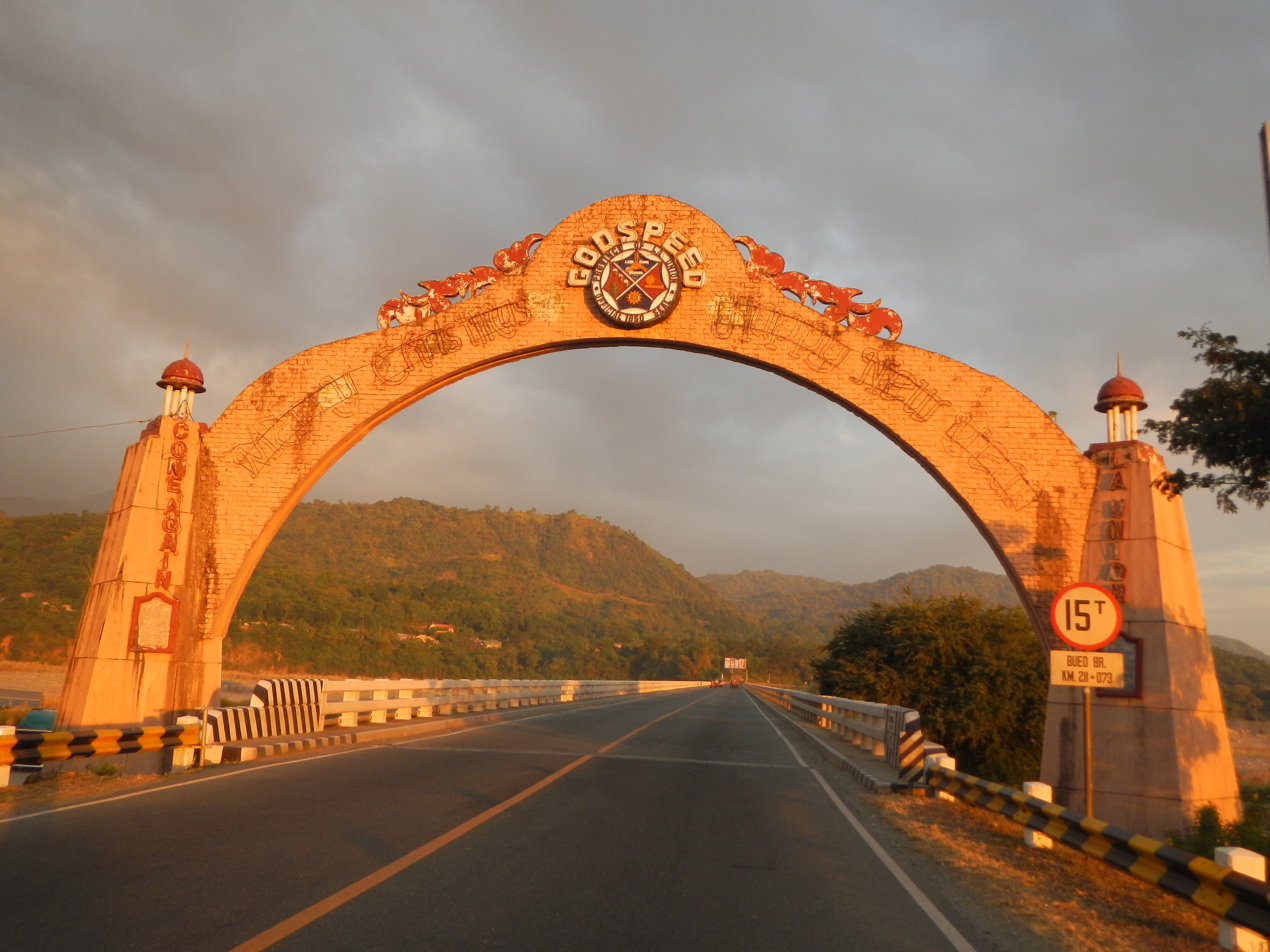
La Union Welcome Arch at Rosario

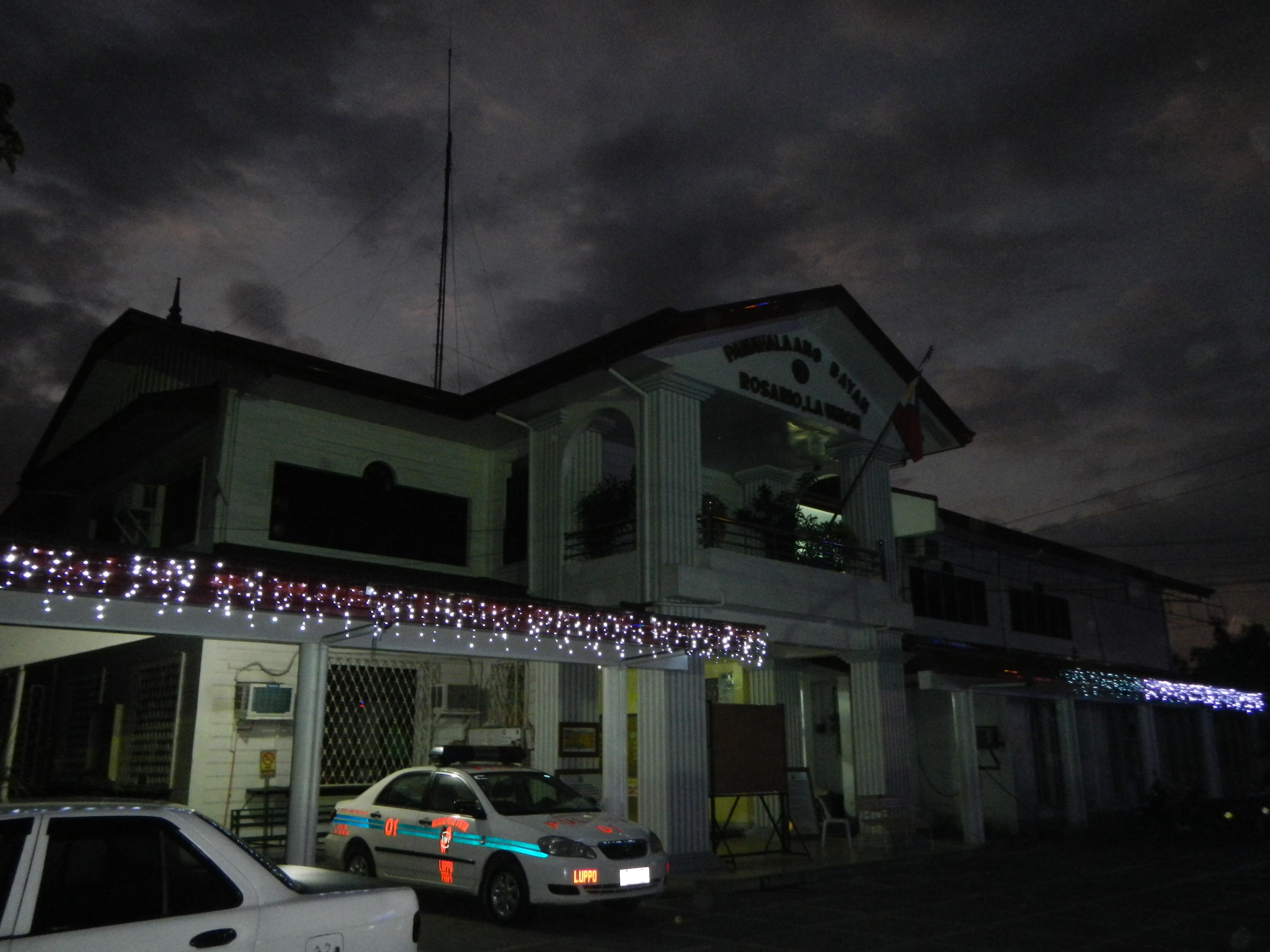
Municipal hall

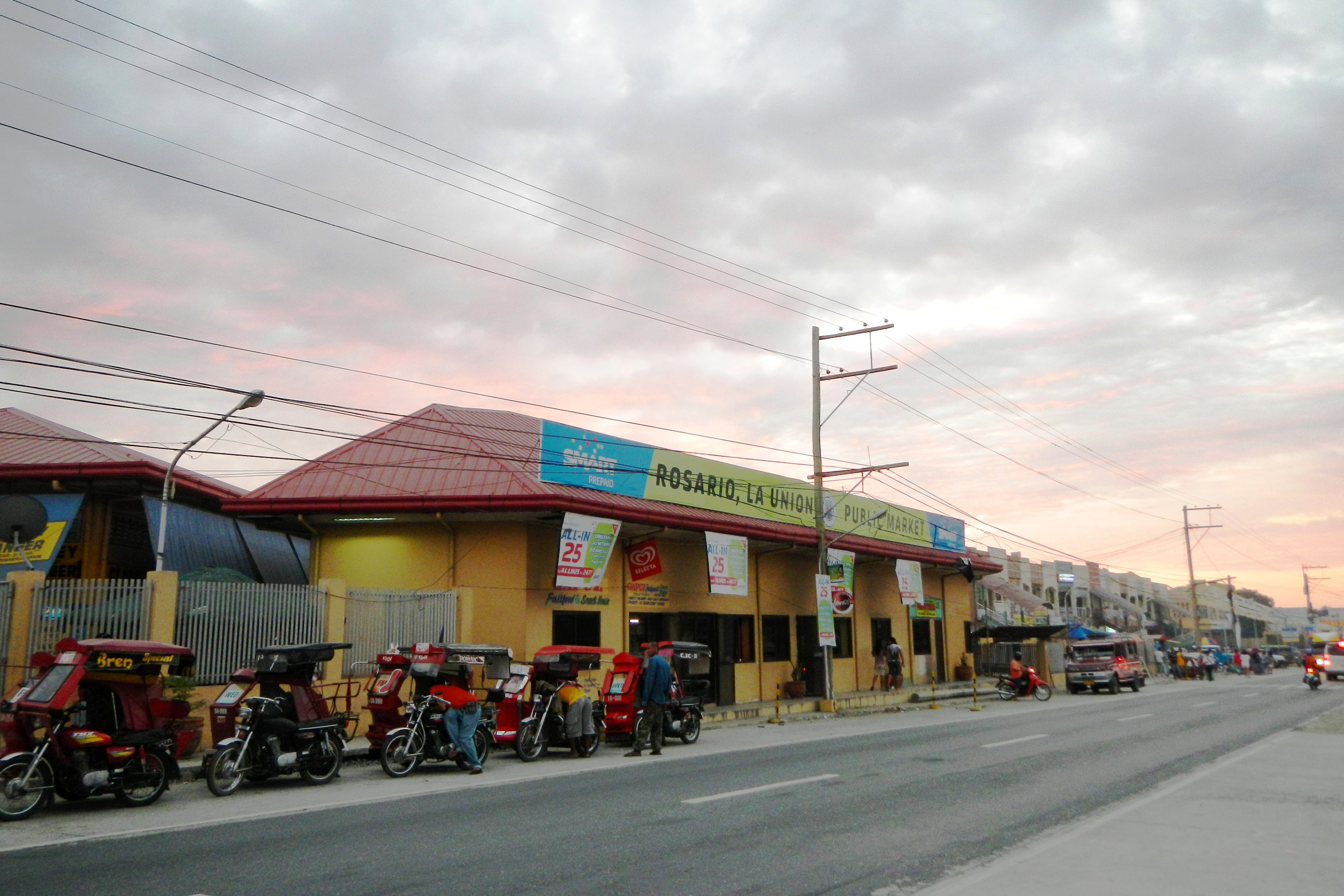
Town Proper

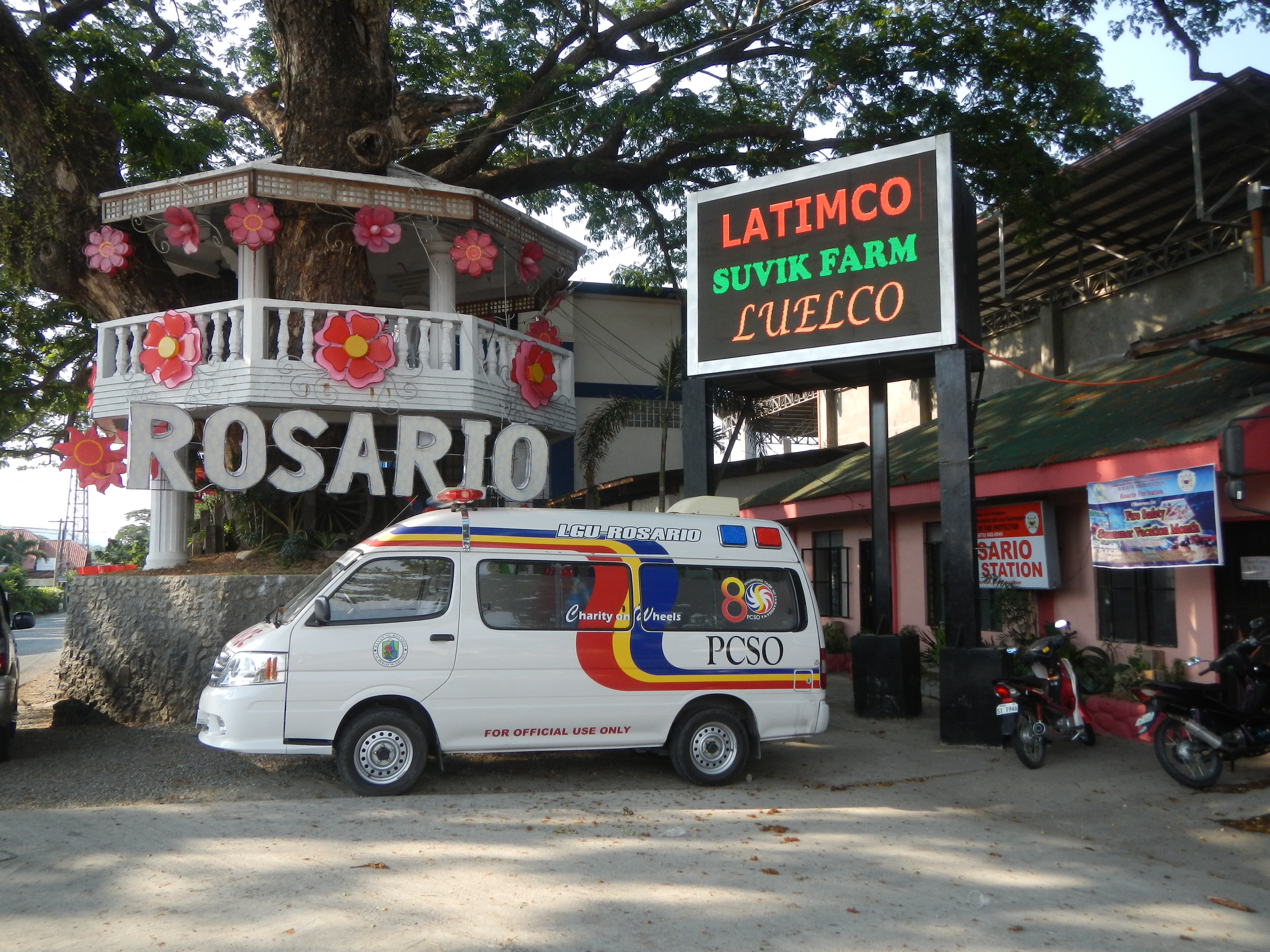
Old Acasia Treehouse

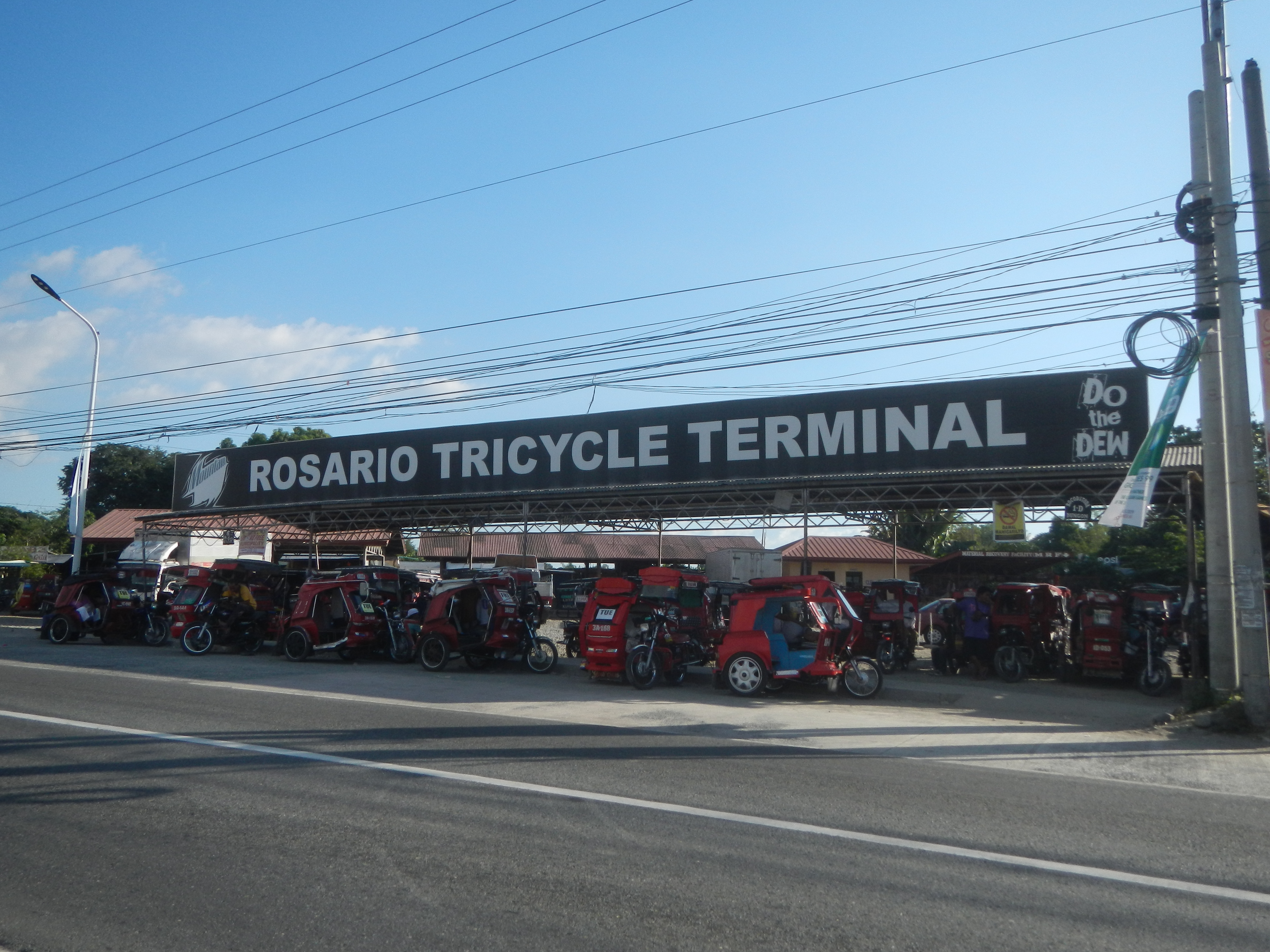
Rosario Tricycle Terminal

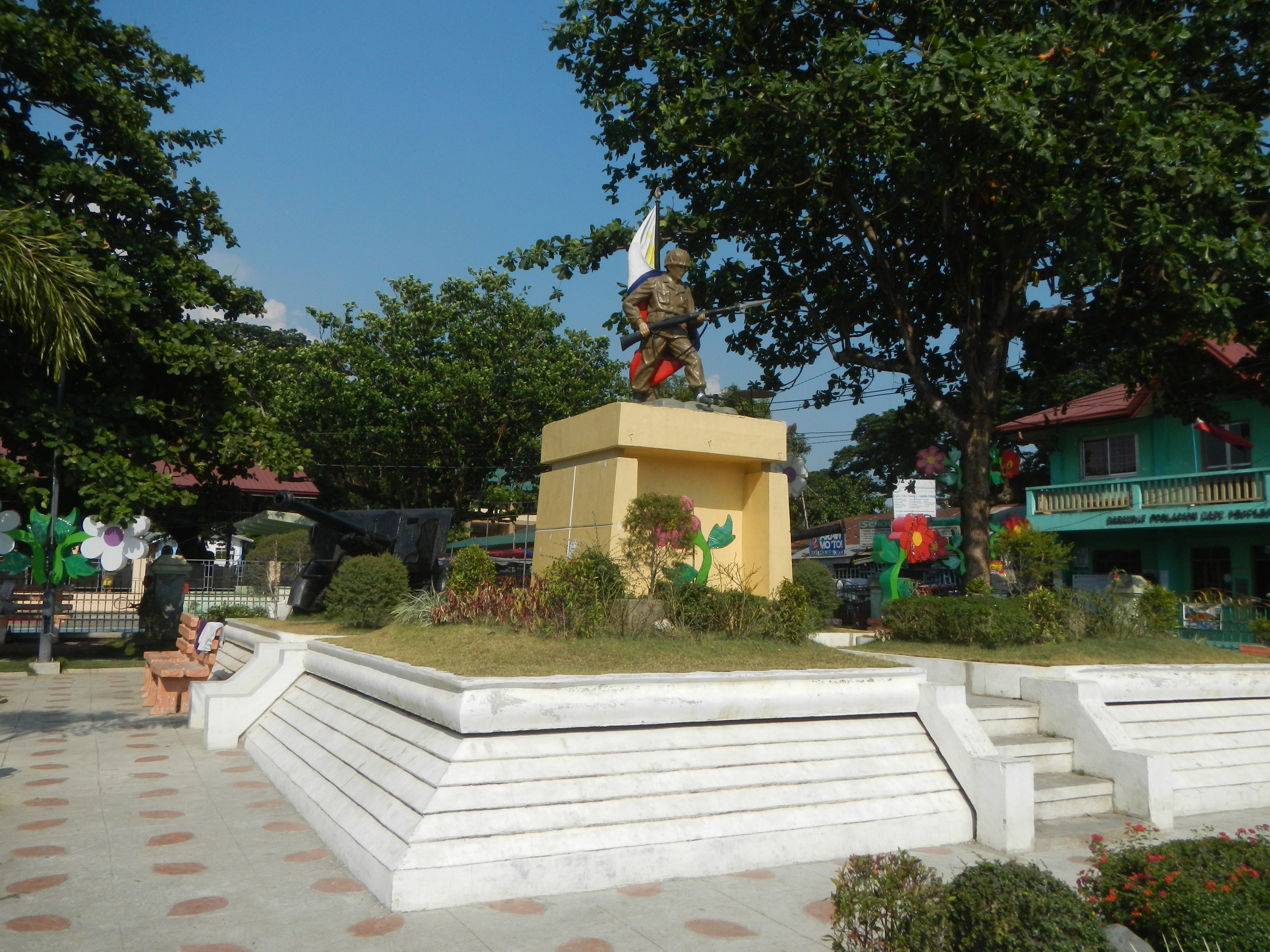
World War II Monument

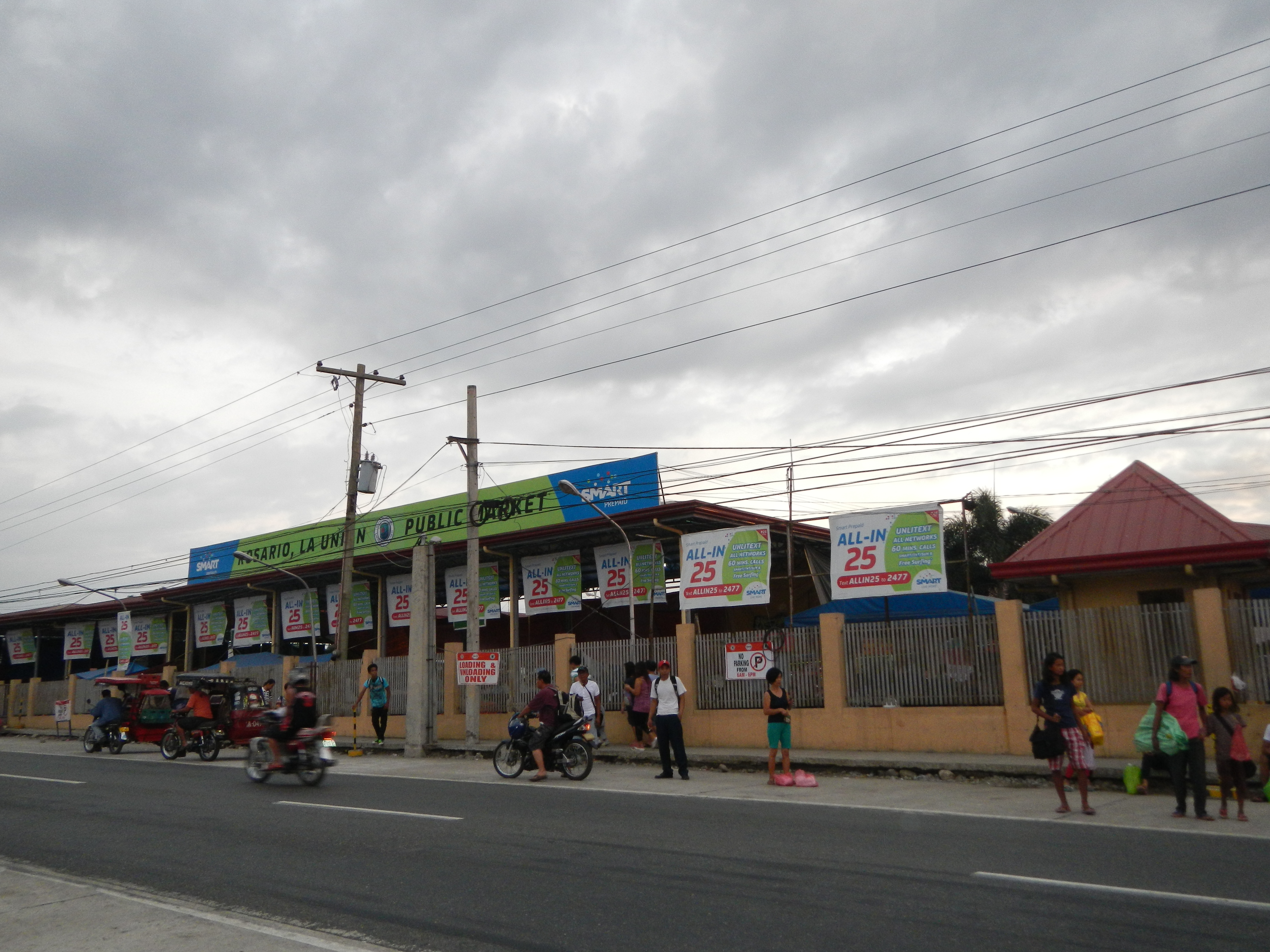
Public Market

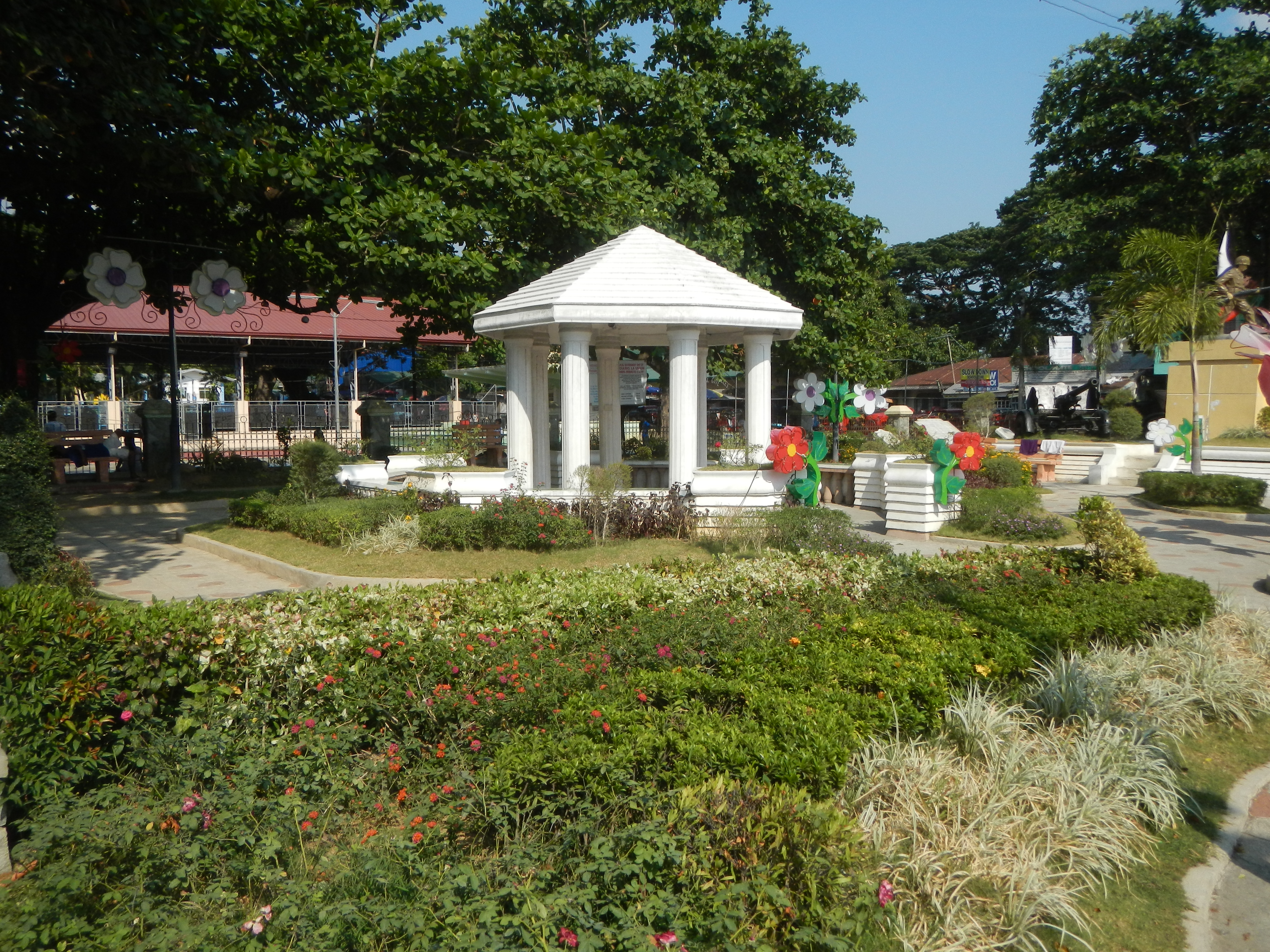
Town Plaza

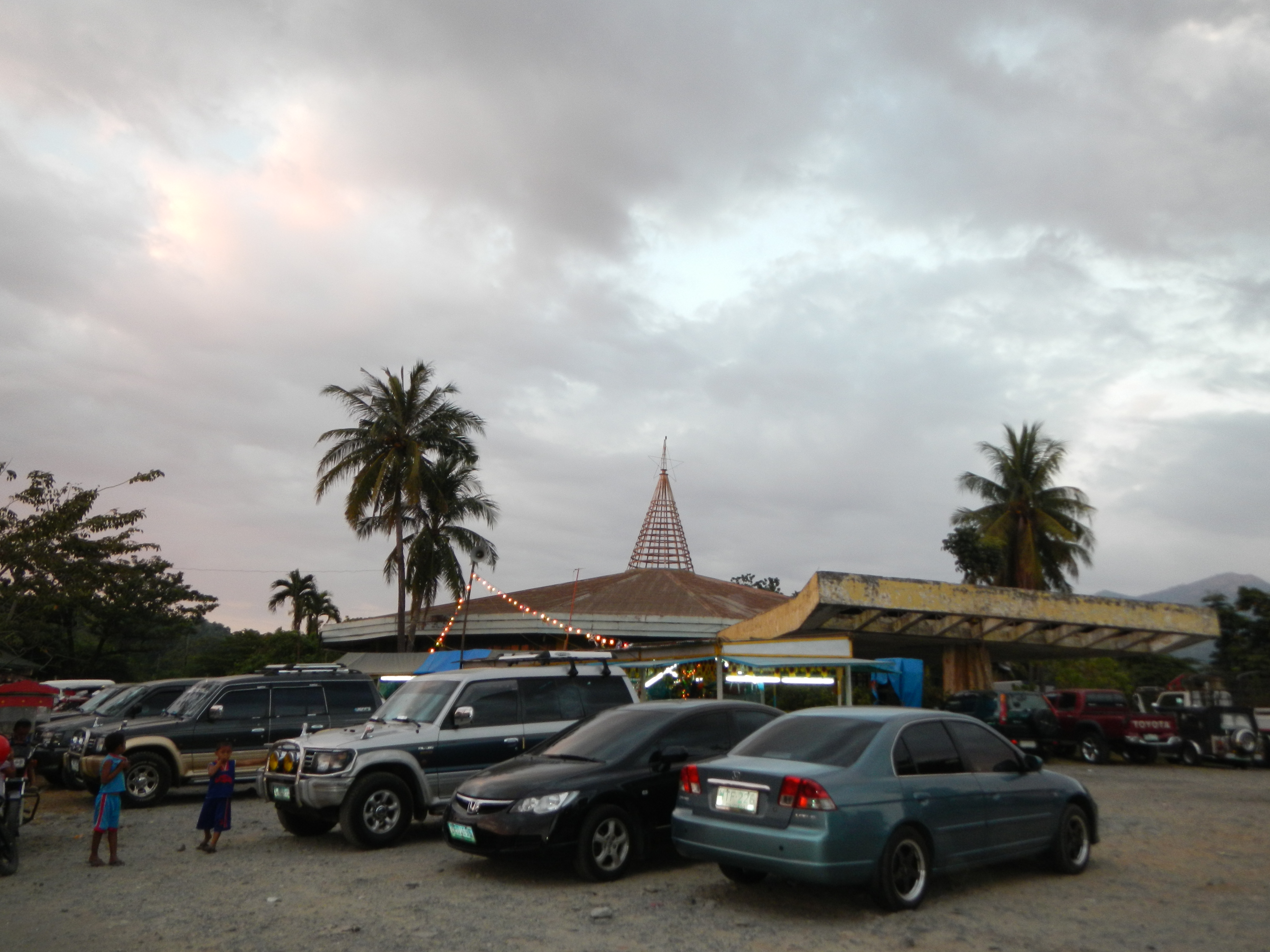
Rosario intersection

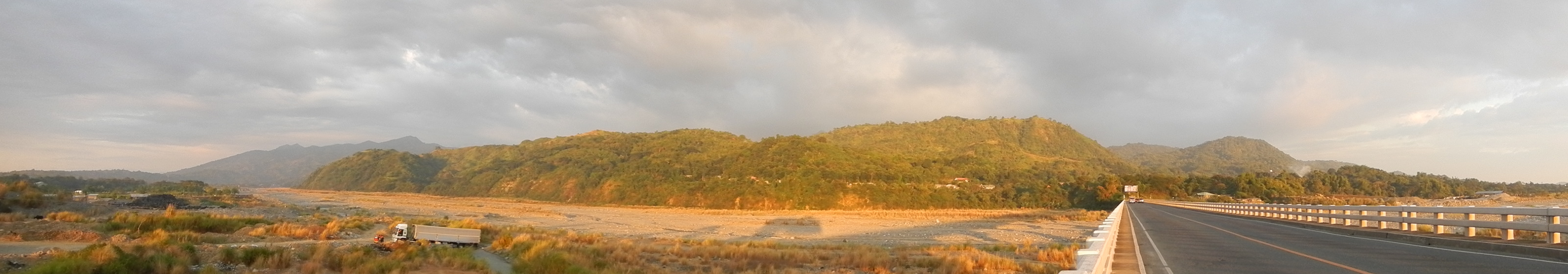
Bued River
