= Santo Tomas, La Union =

Municipality in La Union, Philippines

Santo Tomas
- Municipality
- Municipality of Santo Tomas
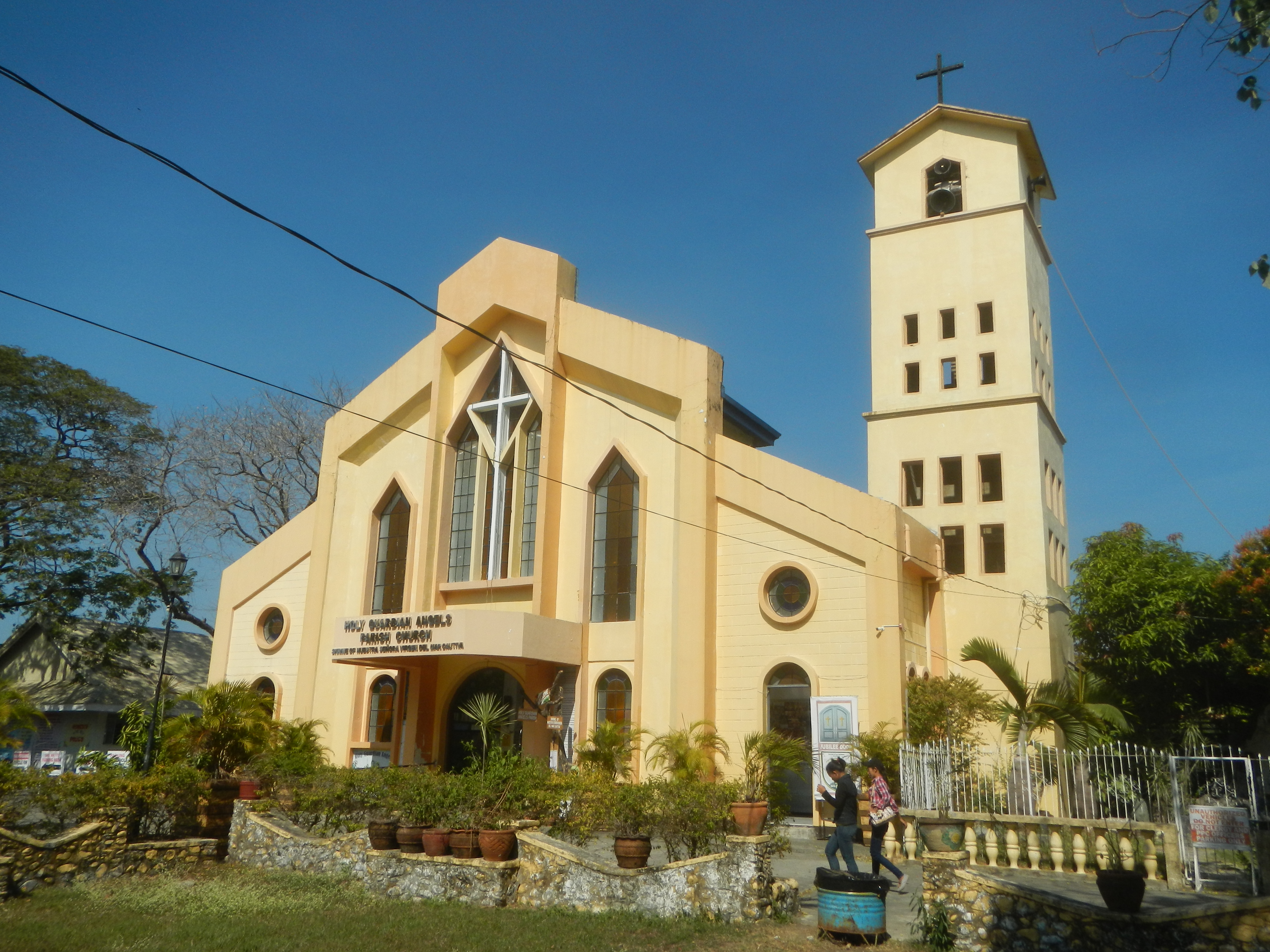
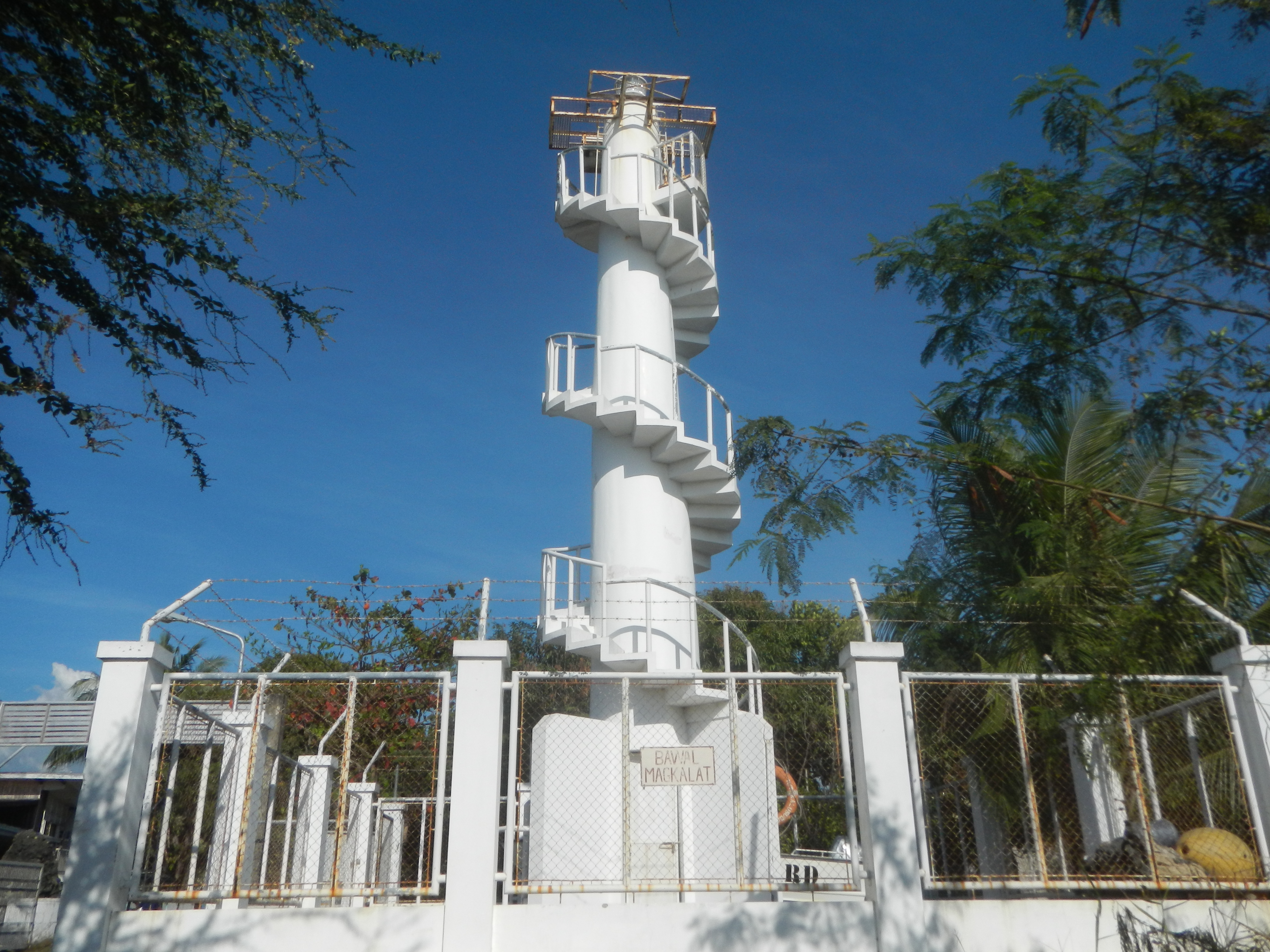
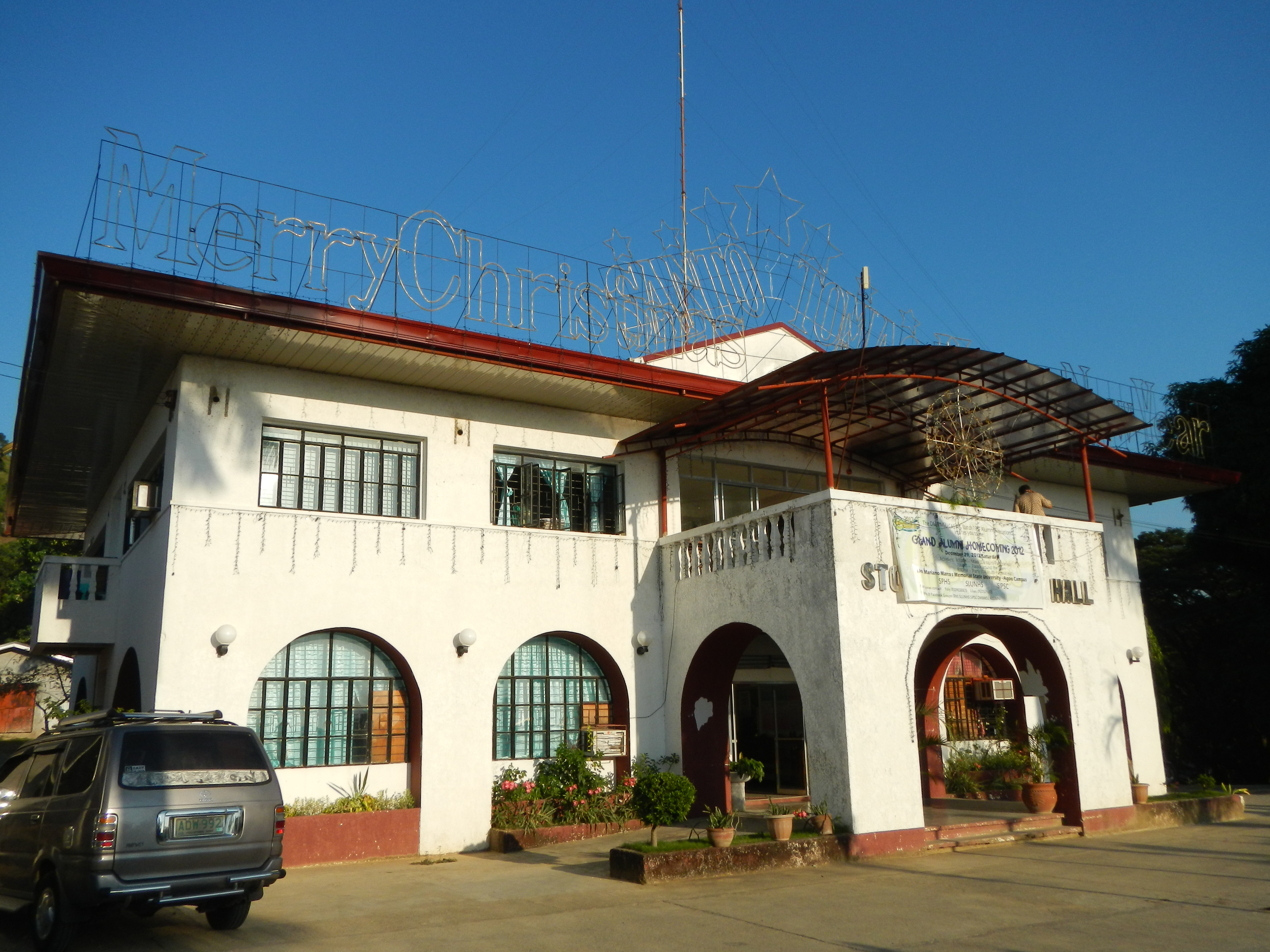
- Shrine of Nuestra Señora Virgen del Mar Cautiva, Santo Tomas Lighthouse and Municipal Hall

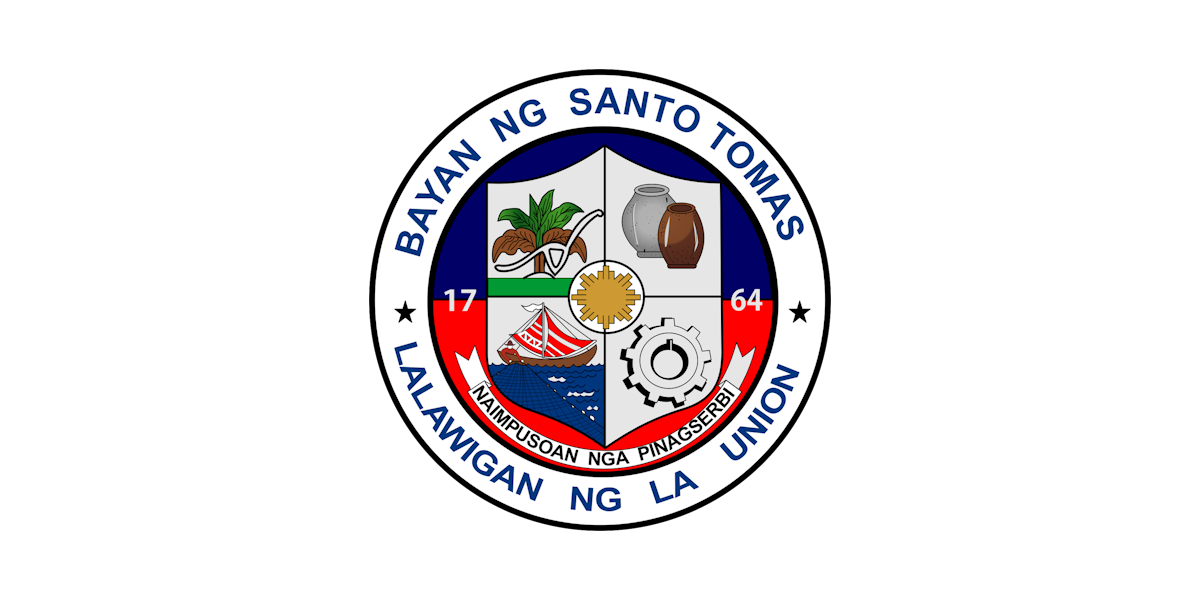
- Flag Seal

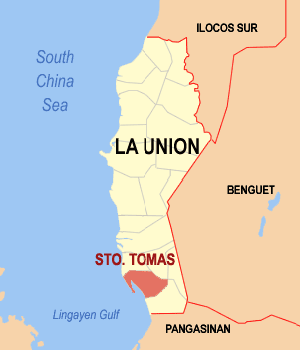
- Map of La Union with Santo Tomas highlighted
- Interactive map of Santo Tomas
- Location within the Philippines
- Coordinates: 16°17′N 120°23′E
- Country: Philippines
- Region: Ilocos Region
- Province: La Union
- District: 2nd district
- Founded: 1764
- Named for: Thomas Aquinas
- Barangays: 24 (see Barangays)

Government
  - Type: Sangguniang Bayan
  - Mayor: Severino C. Carbonell
  - Vice Mayor: Winnie N. Doctolero
  - Representative: Dante S. Garcia
  - Municipal Council: Members: Carlito M. dela Cruz Jr.; Anthony M. Villanueva; Aldreyn Rey S. Cabico; Celiaflor M. Bejar; Noel G. Basi; Leonor J. Tagubat; Lorenzo R. Medina Jr.; Vilea R. Capinpin
  - Electorate: 27,186 voters (2025)

Area
  - Total: 64.00 km^{2} (24.71 sq mi)
- Elevation: 42 m (138 ft)
- Highest elevation: 308 m (1,010 ft)
- Lowest elevation: −2 m (−6.6 ft)

Population (2024 census)
  - Total: 42,777
  - Density: 668.4/km^{2} (1,731/sq mi)
  - Households: 10,392
- Demonym: Tomasian

Economy
  - Income class: 1st municipal income class
  - Poverty incidence: 8.87% (2023)
  - Revenue: ₱ 248.8 million (2024)
  - Assets: ₱ 1,234 million (2024)
  - Expenditure: ₱ 170.3 million (2024)
  - Liabilities: ₱ 94.73 million (2024)

Service provider
  - Electricity: La Union Electric Cooperative (LUELCO)
- Time zone: UTC+8 (PST)
- ZIP code: 2505
- PSGC: 0103317000
- IDD : area code: +63 (0)72
- Native languages: Ilocano; Pangasinan; Tagalog
- Website: www.santotomaslaunion.gov.ph

Santo Tomás, officially the Municipality of Santo Tomas (Ilocano: Ili ti Santo Tomas; Pangasinan: Baley na Santo Tomas; Filipino: Bayan ng Santo Tomas), is a coastal municipality in the province of La Union, Philippines. According to the 2024 census, it has a population of 42,777 people.

== Etymology ==
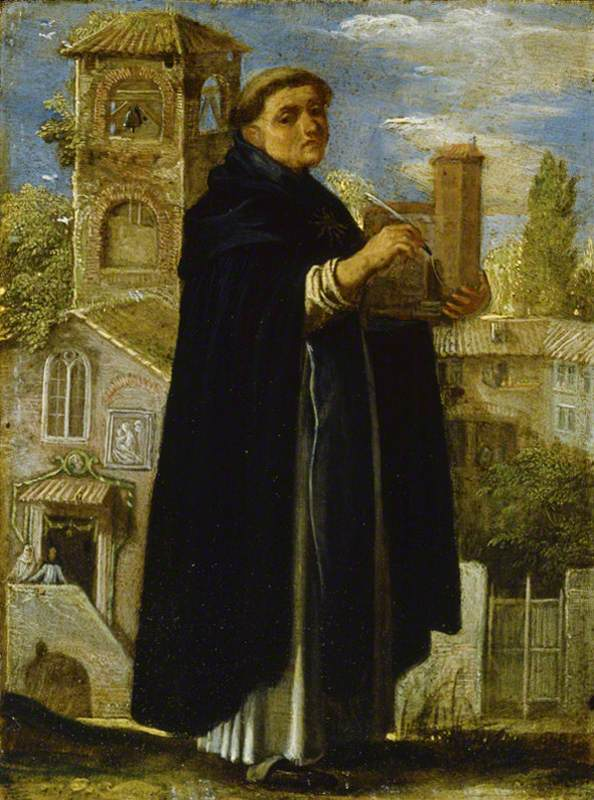
Santo Tomas (Saint Thomas Aquinas)

The name Santo Tomás originates from the Spanish term for Saint Thomas (Saint Thomas Aquinas), a 13th-century Catholic priest, philosopher, and theologian celebrated for synthesizing faith and reason, authoring the Summa Theologica, and shaping Western Christian thought.

The town was named in his honor by Augustinian friars in the 16th century during the Spanish colonization, following the tradition of dedicating settlements to Christian saints. The town's rich religious heritage continues to be a significant part of its identity, with numerous churches and cultural practices rooted in its Catholic origins.

== History ==
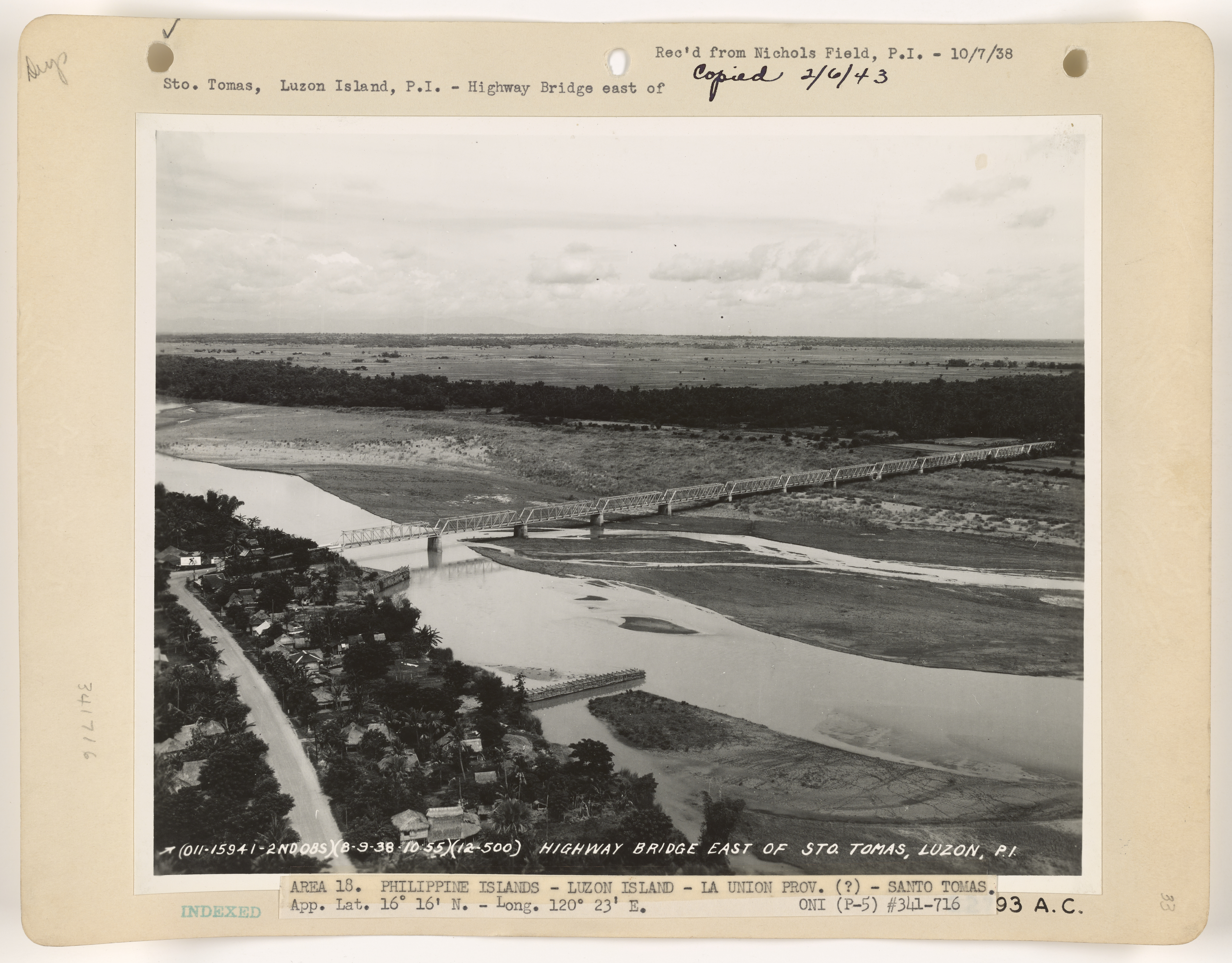
Aerial view of a highway bridge east of Santo Tomas, circa 1940

=== Early history ===
During its early history, the town served as a settlement for the Pangasinans, strategically located along its fertile coastal plains. Together with neighboring areas such as Agoo and Aringay, it played a pivotal role in the trade network of Northern Luzon. Its naturally shaped coastline offered an excellent harbor for foreign vessels entering Lingayen Gulf, establishing the area as a significant trading hub. This strategic location attracted Japanese and Chinese merchants who engaged in the exchange of goods with the native population, transforming the settlement into a thriving center of commerce.

One of the most highly valued trade items was gold from the Cordilleras (modern-day Benguet), which was greatly prized by foreign traders. In addition to gold, the region also exported beeswax—used in the production of candles and various other goods—along with porcelain, silk, cotton, gemstones, rice and beads. These goods were traded for luxury items, tools, and other valuable commodities brought by foreign merchants.

=== Spanish Colonization ===
In June 1572, Spanish voyagers led by conquistador Juan de Salcedo landed in the trading port of Agoo after navigating the Angalacan River in Pangasinan and following three Japanese ships. Upon their arrival, a brief skirmish broke out between the Japanese merchants and the local natives. Salcedo demanded tribute from them to the Spanish Crown and subsequently subjugated the population to Christianity.

By 1578, the Franciscans established a permanent settlement in the area, constructing a visita (a small mission chapel) made of bamboo. They introduced the catechism to the locals and integrated the visita into the larger ecclesiastical district centered in Agoo. Santo Tomas, along with the present-day towns of Tubao, Rosario, Pugo, and Aringay, was initially part of Agoo's territory.

In 1661, Andres Malong of Pangasinan led a rebellion against Spanish colonial rule in an attempt to liberate several areas in Northern Luzon, including the present-day province of La Union. As part of his campaign, Malong sought to reclaim Santo Tomas from Spanish control. However, his forces suffered a decisive defeat during the Battle of Agoo, where the Spanish, with their superior weaponry and strategic fortifications, repelled the rebellion.

The Spanish authorities had already established the settlements in Santo Tomas as a barrio of Mangaldan, a pueblo under the province of Pangasinan, headed by a gobernadorcillo and a cabeza de barangay. Elites, or the principalía and insulares, became the prominent people holding positions of power.

By the 1700s, due to population pressures and oppressive conditions under Spanish rule, Ilocano migrants from the Ilocos provinces and nearby towns began settling in the coastal areas of La Union. Initially arriving in Agoo, they gradually moved south to the fertile plains of Santo Tomas. They settled, cultivated lands for agriculture, and improved the settlement, with intermarriage occurring between the Ilocano settlers and the Pangasinans leading locals to Ilocanized Pangasineses.

In 1764, Santo Tomas was officially separated from Mangaldan and became a pueblo (town) under a Spanish Royal Decree. Don Lorenzo de los Reyes, a prominent native of Santo Tomas, was appointed its first gobernadorcillo, overseeing local governance under the Spanish administration. However, the Spanish authorities were displeased with his administration, and as a result, the town was merged back with Agoo.

By 1785, Santo Tomas regained its autonomy as a town after nearly 21 years as a barrio of Agoo. Santo Tomas’ cabeza de barangay, Don Domingo Carpio, courageously initiated the secession movement of Santo Tomas from Agoo. His sincerity and dedication as a leader earned him the overwhelming support of his townmates. The strong backing from the people forced the Spanish authorities to surrender control of the town. Under the administration of Don Domingo Carpio, the town experienced remarkable growth and stability. His excellent leadership led to his appointment as Gobernadorcillo.

On October 29, 1849, Governor-General Narciso Clavería y Zaldúa issued a decree merging eight towns from Pangasinan, including Santo Tomas, three from Ilocos Sur, and 40-45 rancherías in the Cordillera to form the province of La Union. The establishment of the province was formalized on March 2, 1850, through the Superior Decreto signed by Governor-General Antonio María Blanco. Santo Tomas was one of the founding towns, alongside San Fernando (cabecera), Agoo, Aringay, Cava (Caba), Naguilian, Bauang, San Juan, Balaoan, Namacpacan (Luna), Bangar, and Bacnotan. This formation was confirmed on April 18, 1854, by a royal decree (real orden) from Queen Isabella II of Spain.

The province experienced economic progress, particularly in agriculture, with tobacco and rice as Santo Tomas’ main products.

On August 7, 1869, Governor-General Carlos de la Torre decreed the conversion of Barrio Concepcion in Santo Tomas into a new town called Rosario. Rosario was established as a civil town but remained spiritually dependent on Santo Tomas. However, the Catholic Bishop refused to assign a co-adjutor priest due to insufficient stipends, leaving Rosario reliant on the priest of Santo Tomas, who managed both parishes.

=== Philippine Revolution ===
The Philippine Revolution in La Union began on May 22, 1898, with a small uprising in Santo Tomas. A single shot from a small revolver killed the much-hated Augustinian friar, Mariano Garcia, marking the end of Spanish rule in the province. Enraged revolutionaries stormed the convent, seized the priest, chained him, and beheaded him. This act sparked a series of massacres (hecatombes) throughout the province.

Through the years, the residents of Santo Tomas actively participated in the fight for independence against Spanish colonial rule across La Union. Under the leadership of General Manuel Tinio, a close ally of the Philippine president Emilio Aguinaldo, the locals engaged in significant resistance efforts in Northern Luzon.

By August 18, 1898, La Union had achieved final victory, marking the definitive collapse of Spanish resistance in the region. This victory brought the revolutionaries closer to their ultimate goal of freedom from Spanish colonial rule.

=== American Colonization ===
The independence of the Philippines from Spain was short-lived, as the Philippine–American War soon followed. In 1899, Santo Tomas became a center of resistance against American forces. Guerrilla Unit No. 5, under the leadership of Captain Santiago Fontanilla, operated in the areas of Santo Tomas, Agoo, Aringay, and Tubao.

The guerrilla forces played a crucial role in resisting American advances and defending the town's autonomy. On November 18, 1899, American troops arrived in coastal La Union via Rabon Point after successfully taking Pozorrubio and San Fabian in Pangasinan under General Samuel Baldwin Marks Young. This led to a decisive battle along the coast of Santo Tomas and nearby Tubao. By November 19, the Americans had taken control of Santo Tomas and Agoo, and by November 20, they had captured the revolutionary headquarters in San Fernando.

By May 1, 1901, the General Manuel Tinio Brigade surrendered to the Americans, marking the end of the Philippine-American War in La Union and the surrounding region.

Under the American regime, the local administration transitioned to a new system where municipal presidents replaced the previous capitanes. Don Bruno Pacho was appointed as the first Presidente Municipal of Santo Tomas, serving until 1901. Several successors followed, with Don Eusebio Tabora as the last municipal president under the American administration.

By 1903, the Philippine Commission reorganized the administrative and territorial structure of municipalities across the country. Due to sparse population and financial challenges, smaller municipalities were merged. As a result, Santo Tomas was integrated with Agoo. However, on January 1, 1908, Executive Order No. 41 restored Santo Tomas as an independent municipality.

=== Japanese Occupation ===
When World War II broke out in 1941, Japanese soldiers landed along the shores of Santo Tomas on 22 December 1941. This temporarily ended American rule in the town.

Under Japanese occupation, the municipal government was reorganized, and municipal mayors were appointed as heads of the town. Don Moises Villanueva became the first municipal mayor under Japanese rule in 1942. Four municipal mayors served during the Japanese occupation, with the last being Don Venacio Paculan, whose term ended a day after American forces landed along Lingayen Gulf on January 14, 1945, to begin the liberation of Luzon.

=== Post-War Era ===
After World War II, Santo Tomas underwent significant reconstruction and development. The town’s agricultural industry, particularly tobacco and rice production, remained a cornerstone of its economy. Efforts to rebuild infrastructure, including roads, bridges, and schools, were prioritized, contributing to the town's recovery and modernization.

When the Commonwealth government was re-established, President Sergio Osmeña reorganized various municipal units. Don Eusebio Tabora was reappointed as the first post-liberation municipal mayor of Santo Tomas.

== Geography ==
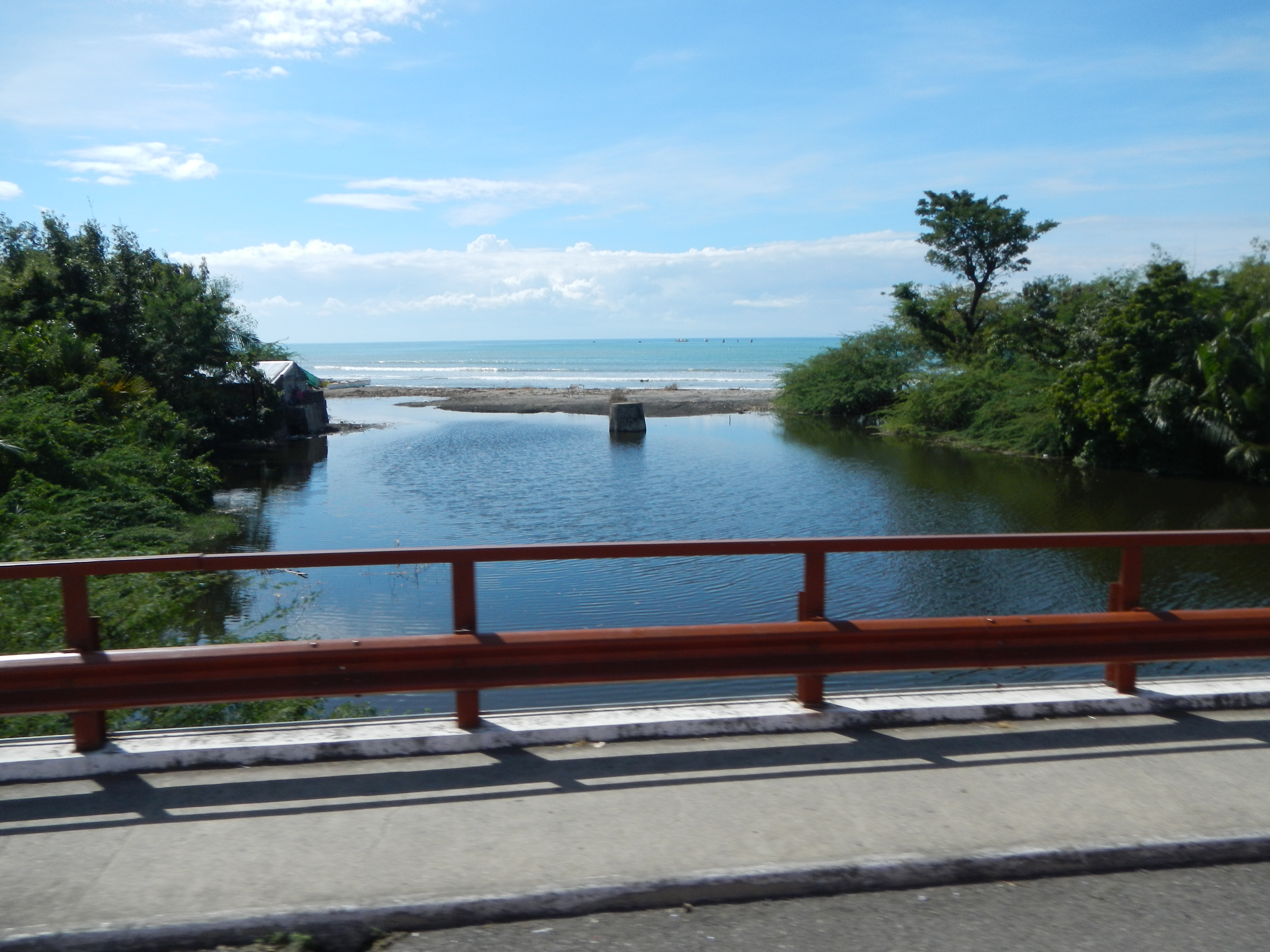
Damortis Protected area

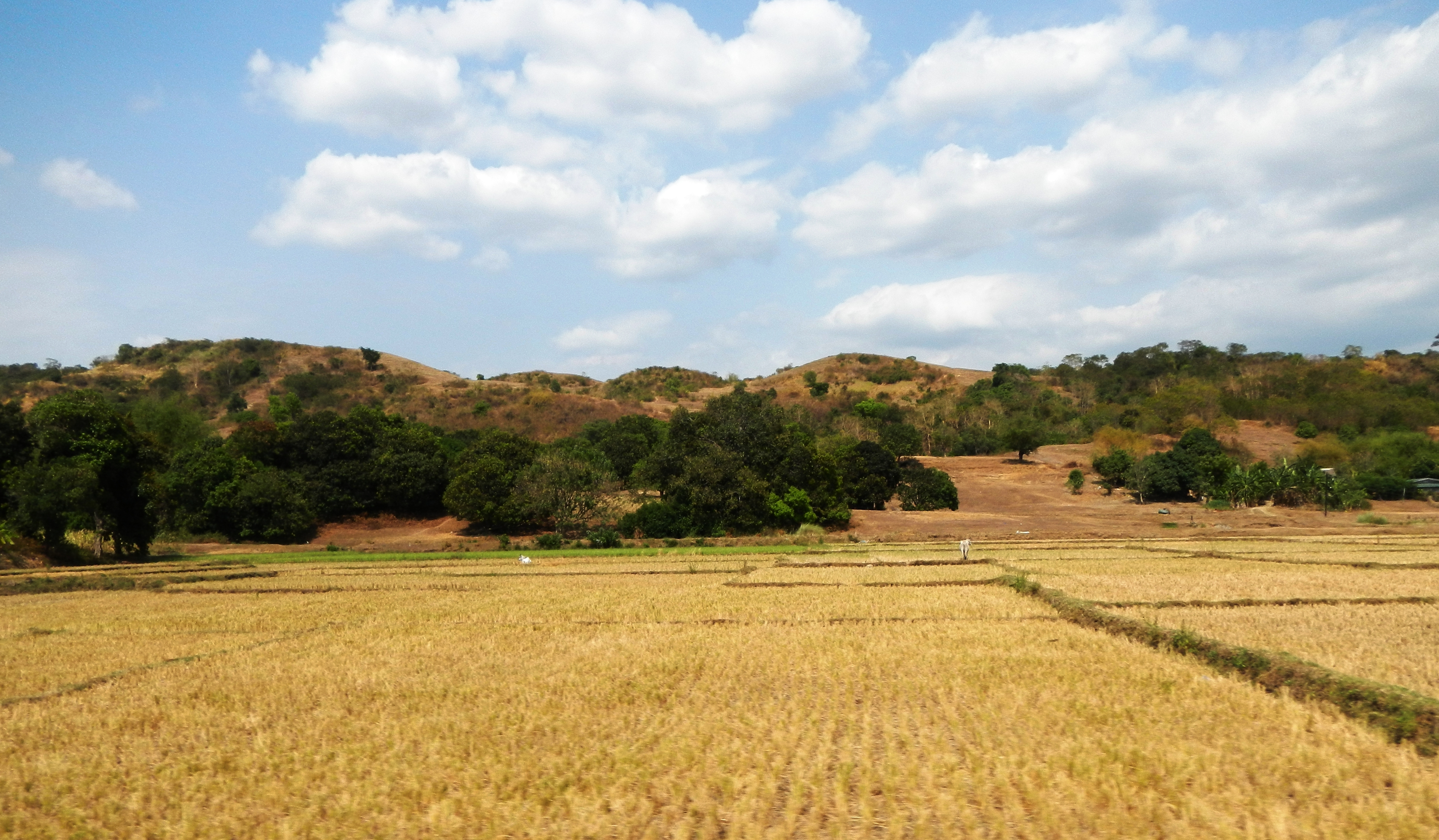
Damortis Landscape Terrain

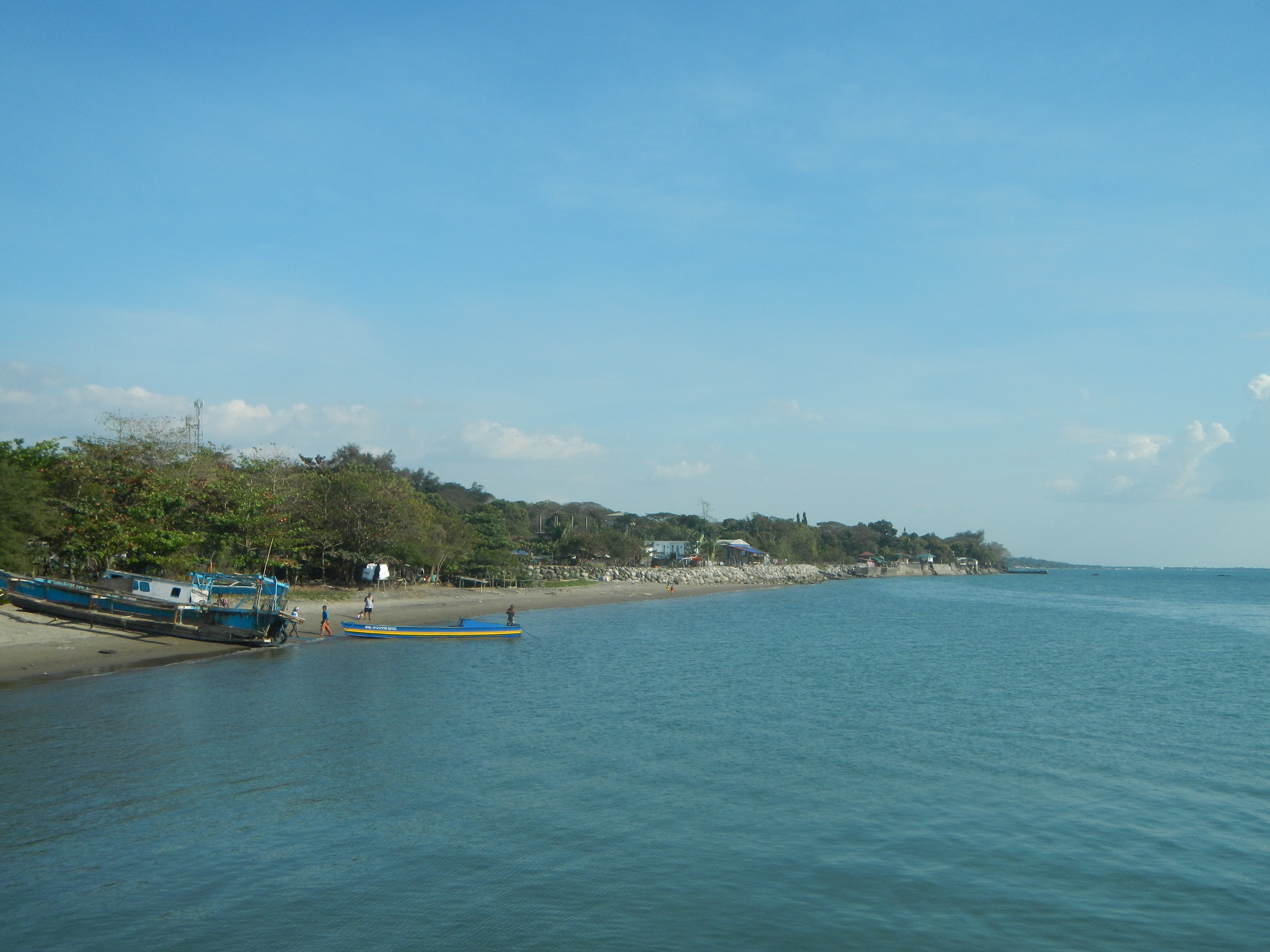
Coastal area in Damortis

The Municipality of Santo Tomas is a coastal municipality located on a narrow plain between the foothills of the Cordillera Central and the Lingayen Gulf (also known as the South China Sea). It covers a land area of 64.00 square kilometers (24.71 square miles), which accounts for 4.27% of La Union's total area. Situated in the southern part of the province, Santo Tomas is bordered by Agoo to the north, Tubao and Pugo to the northeast, Rosario to the south and southeast, and the Lingayen Gulf to the west. As one of the municipalities in the second district of La Union, it occupies the smallest portion of the district.

Santo Tomas is situated 39.74 kilometres (24.69 mi) from the provincial capital San Fernando, and 228.91 kilometres (142.24 mi) from the country's capital city of Manila.

=== Topography ===
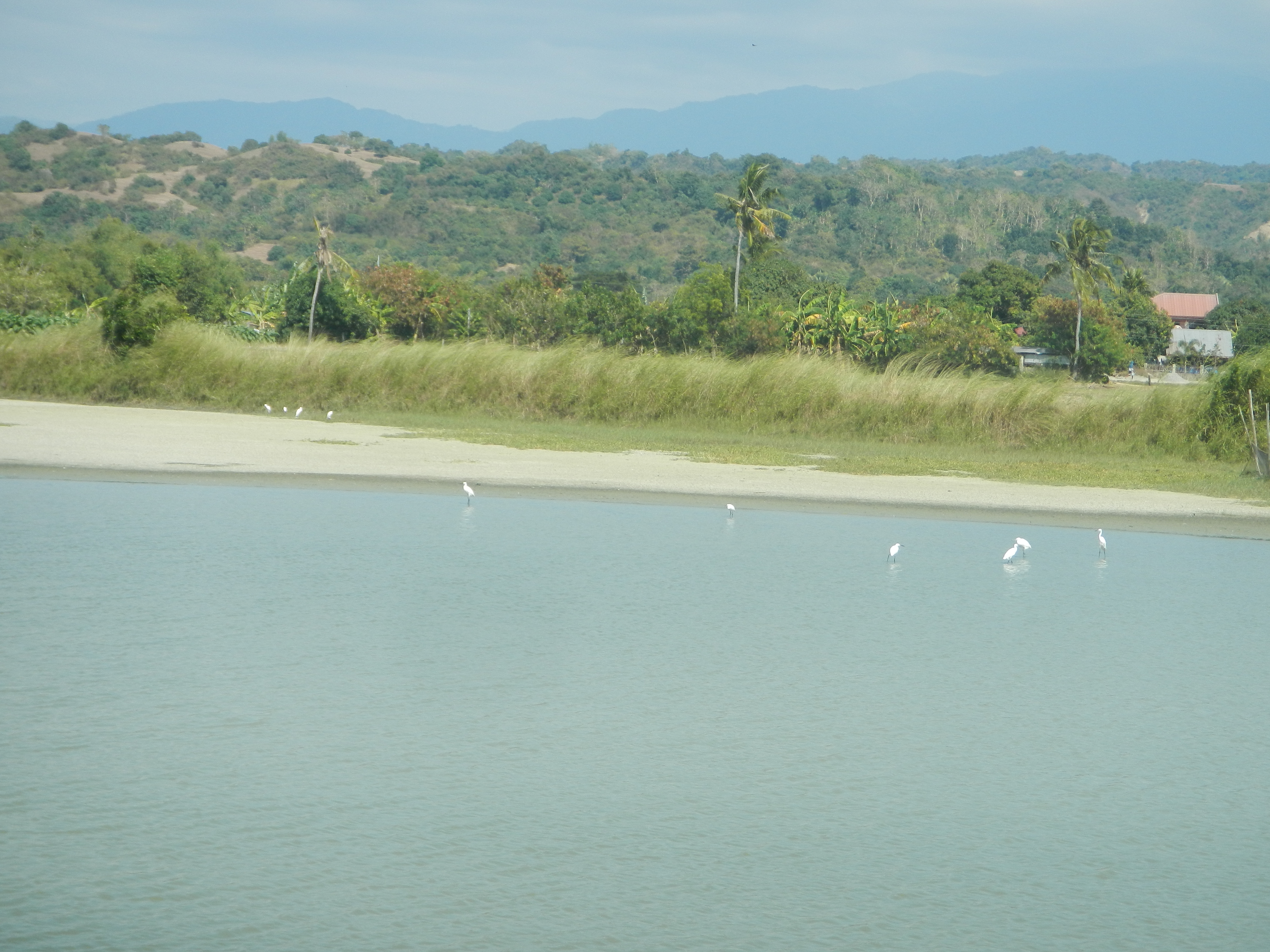
Wetland in Ubagan

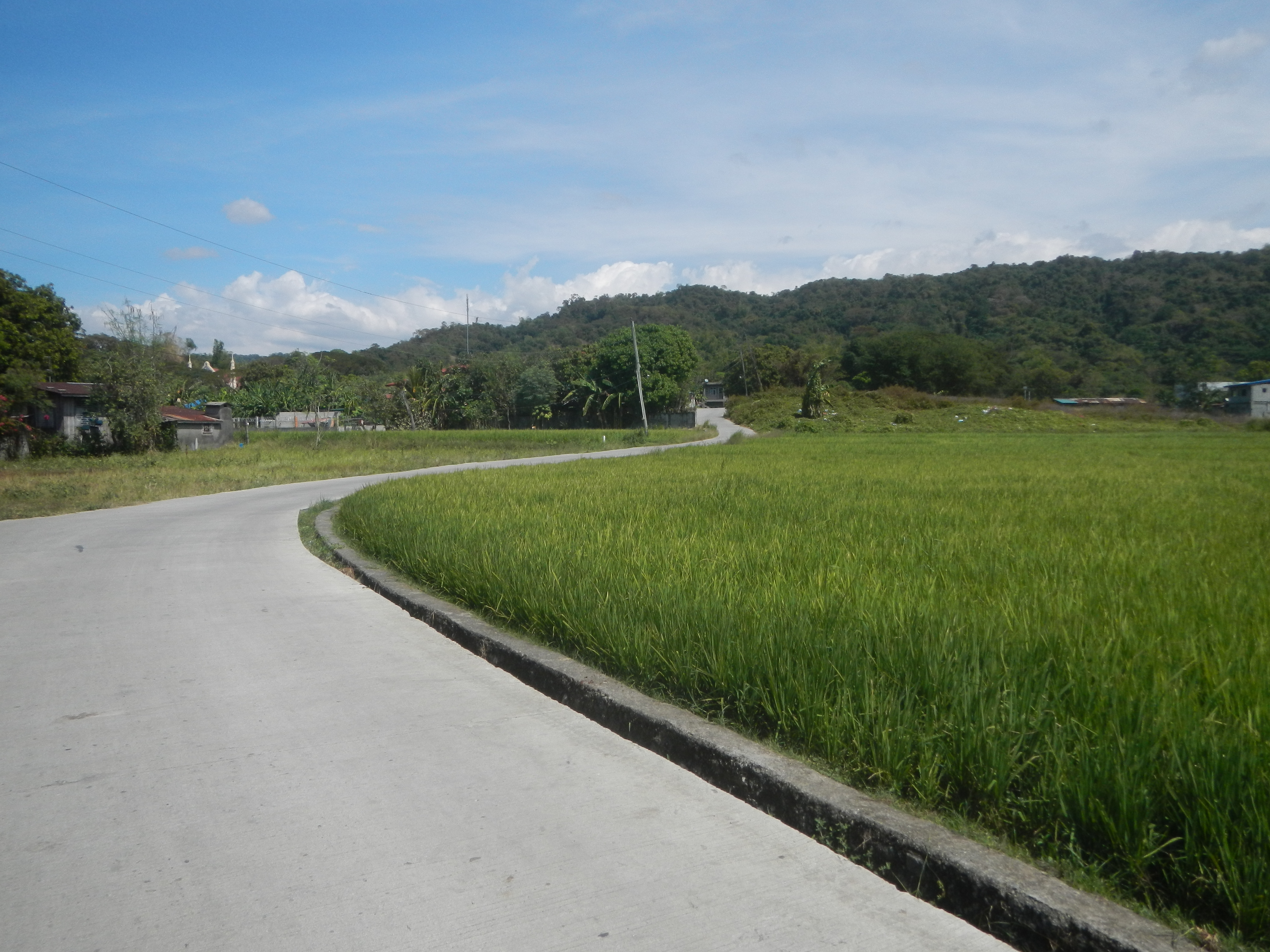
Landscape in Lomboy

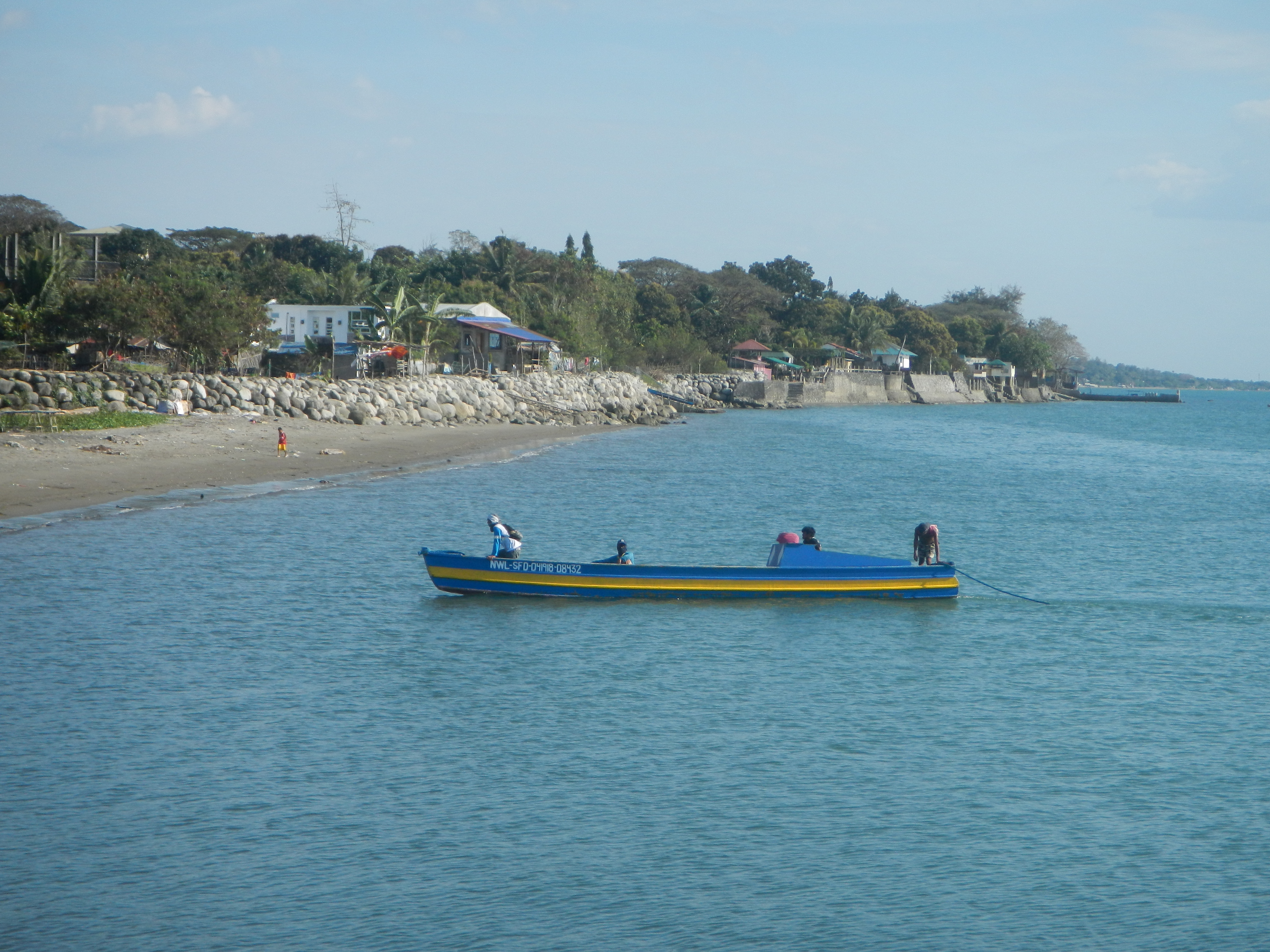
Damortis Beach

The town’s topography is defined by a valley with heavy loam and clay soils. The coastal plains transition sharply into steep ranges, with elevated areas to the west and hilly and mountainous terrain rising gradually to the east. Two prominent mountains are located in the town, both situated at the foothills of the Cordillera Central: Mount Carmen, found in Patac, and Mount Kimmallogong (a hat-shaped mountain), located between Casilagan and Bail.

Several rivers, creeks, and brooks traverse the town, with the Cupang and Manaclew Rivers being the two main rivers in the town. Barangays Pongpong, Bail, Casilagan, and Ambitacay are all situated between two hills. Meanwhile, a plateau is found in Barangay Patac, where a Grotto of the Virgin Mary is located.

Santo Tomas has long shorelines that cover eleven barangays. Its narrowest coastal plains are near Damortis and the town proper. In addition to these extensive shorelines, the town is home to Capeng-peng Lake, located at the western part of Barangays Tococ and Balaoc. To the west of Poblacion, the Raois Lagoon is also found. Both bodies of water are renowned fishing grounds for the residents of Santo Tomas, especially for their high-quality milkfish and oysters, which are considered among the best in the region.

=== Barangays ===
Santo Tomas is politically subdivided into 24 barangays. Each barangay consists of puroks and some have sitios.

- Ambitacay
- Bail
- Balaoc
- Balsaan
- Baybay
- Cabaruan
- Casantaan
- Casilagan
- Cupang
- Damortis
- Fernando
- Linong
- Lomboy
- Malabago
- Namboongan
- Namonitan
- Narvacan
- Patac
- Poblacion
- Pongpong
- Raois
- Tubod
- Tococ
- Ubagan

=== Climate ===
Santo Tomas experiences a Type I climate as defined by the Köppen Climate Classification, which features a clear division between wet and dry seasons. The wet season typically starts around mid-May and continues until late October, while the dry season lasts from December through early May. Heavy rainfall is brought by the Southwest Monsoon (SWM) during the wet season, whereas the Northeast Monsoon (NEM) leads to drier conditions as it moves over the Cordillera Mountains.

Climate data for Santo Tomas, La Union
Month	Jan	Feb	Mar	Apr	May	Jun	Jul	Aug	Sep	Oct	Nov	Dec	Year
Mean daily maximum °C (°F)	30 (86)	32 (90)	33 (91)	34 (93)	33 (91)	31 (88)	30 (86)	30 (86)	30 (86)	31 (88)	31 (88)	31 (88)	31 (88)
Mean daily minimum °C (°F)	20 (68)	21 (70)	22 (72)	24 (75)	25 (77)	25 (77)	25 (77)	25 (77)	24 (75)	23 (73)	22 (72)	21 (70)	23 (74)
Average precipitation mm (inches)	15 (0.6)	16 (0.6)	24 (0.9)	33 (1.3)	102 (4.0)	121 (4.8)	177 (7.0)	165 (6.5)	144 (5.7)	170 (6.7)	56 (2.2)	23 (0.9)	1,046 (41.2)
Average rainy days	6.3	6.6	9.5	12.8	20.6	23.5	25.4	23.4	23.2	21.4	14.0	8.2	194.9
Source: Meteoblue

== Demographics ==
As of the 2020 Census of Population and Housing, the municipality of Santo Tomas, had a total population of 40,846, of this, 40,842 individuals were part of the household population, comprising 99.99% of the total population. This represents an increase of 1.78 thousand from the 39,066 household population in 2015 and 4.85 thousand more than the 35,993 household population in 2010. The total number of households in Santo Tomas was 10,392 in 2020, an increase of 1.40 thousand from the 8,996 households in 2015 and 2.41 thousand from the 7,986 households in 2010.

Population census of Santo Tomas
Year	Pop.	±% p.a.
1903	5,446	—
1918	8,046	+2.64%
1939	10,352	+1.21%
1948	12,897	+2.47%
1960	14,929	+1.23%
1970	19,482	+2.69%
1975	21,341	+1.84%
1980	22,610	+1.16%
1990	27,352	+1.92%
1995	28,192	+0.57%
2000	31,204	+2.20%
2007	33,604	+1.03%
2010	35,999	+2.54%
2015	39,092	+1.58%
2020	40,846	+0.93%
2024	42,777	+1.12%
Source: Philippine Statistics Authority

=== Population Distribution by Barangay ===
Santo Tomas is divided into 24 barangays. The most populous barangay is Patac, which accounted for 8.33% of the total municipal population. Tubod followed with a 7.85% share, while Damortis had 6.62%, Namboongan and Bail each had 6.03%, and Casantaan had 5.91%. The remaining barangays contributed less than 5% each. Malabago was the least populous barangay, making up just 1.14% of the total population, a trend that persisted since the 2015 census.

=== Household Size ===
The average household size (AHS) in Santo Tomas decreased from 4.3 persons in 2015 to 3.9 persons in 2020. In 2010, the AHS was 4.5 persons. Eleven out of 24 barangays had an AHS higher than the municipal average of 3.9 persons.

=== Sex Ratio and Gender Distribution ===
Santo Tomas maintained a sex ratio of 104 males for every 100 females. Of the 40,842 individuals in the household population in 2020, 51.06% were male and 48.94% were female. Males outnumbered females in the age groups 0 to 64 years, while females comprised the majority in the age group 65 years and over.

=== Age Distribution ===
The median age of the household population in 2020 was 26.5 years, indicating that half of the population was younger than this age. This is an increase from the median age of 25.24 years recorded in 2015. The largest age group in 2020 was children aged 10 to 14 years, who made up 10.11% of the population, followed by children aged 5 to 9 years (9.99%) and those aged 0 to 4 years (9.46%). Males outnumbered females in the 0 to 64 age groups, while females outnumbered males in the 65 years and over group.

=== Voting Population ===
In the 2022 elections, Santo Tomas had 25,929 registered voters, with approximately two-thirds of the household population of voting age (18 years and over). The voting-age population in 2020 accounted for 65.04% of the household population, an increase from 63.15% in 2015. Among the voting-age population, 50.45% were male and 49.55% were female.

=== Dependency Ratio ===
The dependency ratio in Santo Tomas decreased to 56 dependents per 100 working-age persons in 2020. Of the household population, young dependents (0 to 14 years) represented 29.57%, while old dependents (65 years and over) made up 6.49%. The working-age population (15 to 64 years) accounted for 63.94%. The overall dependency ratio indicates that for every 100 working-age persons, there were approximately 56 dependents (46 young and 10 old). This ratio is lower than the 58 dependents per 100 working-age persons recorded in 2015.

=== Birth Registration ===
A high percentage of births were registered in Santo Tomas, with 99.57% of the population having their births recorded at the Local Civil Registry Office (LCRO). In 2020, a total of 40,666 persons had their births registered, corresponding to 99.57% of the household population. Among those registered, 51.06% (20,764 persons) were male and 48.94% (19,902 persons) were female, reflecting a sex ratio of 104 males for every 100 females.

=== Marital Status ===
Among the household population aged 10 years and over, 39.49% were married, 39.98% were never married, 5.11% were widowed, 14.16% were in common-law or live-in relationships, and 2.26% were annulled or separated. Among the never-married population, 55.72% were male and 44.28% were female.

=== Ethnicity and language ===
The majority of Santo Tomas' population belongs to the Ilocano ethnolinguistic group. There are also smaller populations of Pangasinenses, Tagalogs, and indigenous groups such as the Bago and Ibaloi. Iloco is the predominant language spoken, while Filipino and English are also widely used for communication and instruction.

=== Religion ===
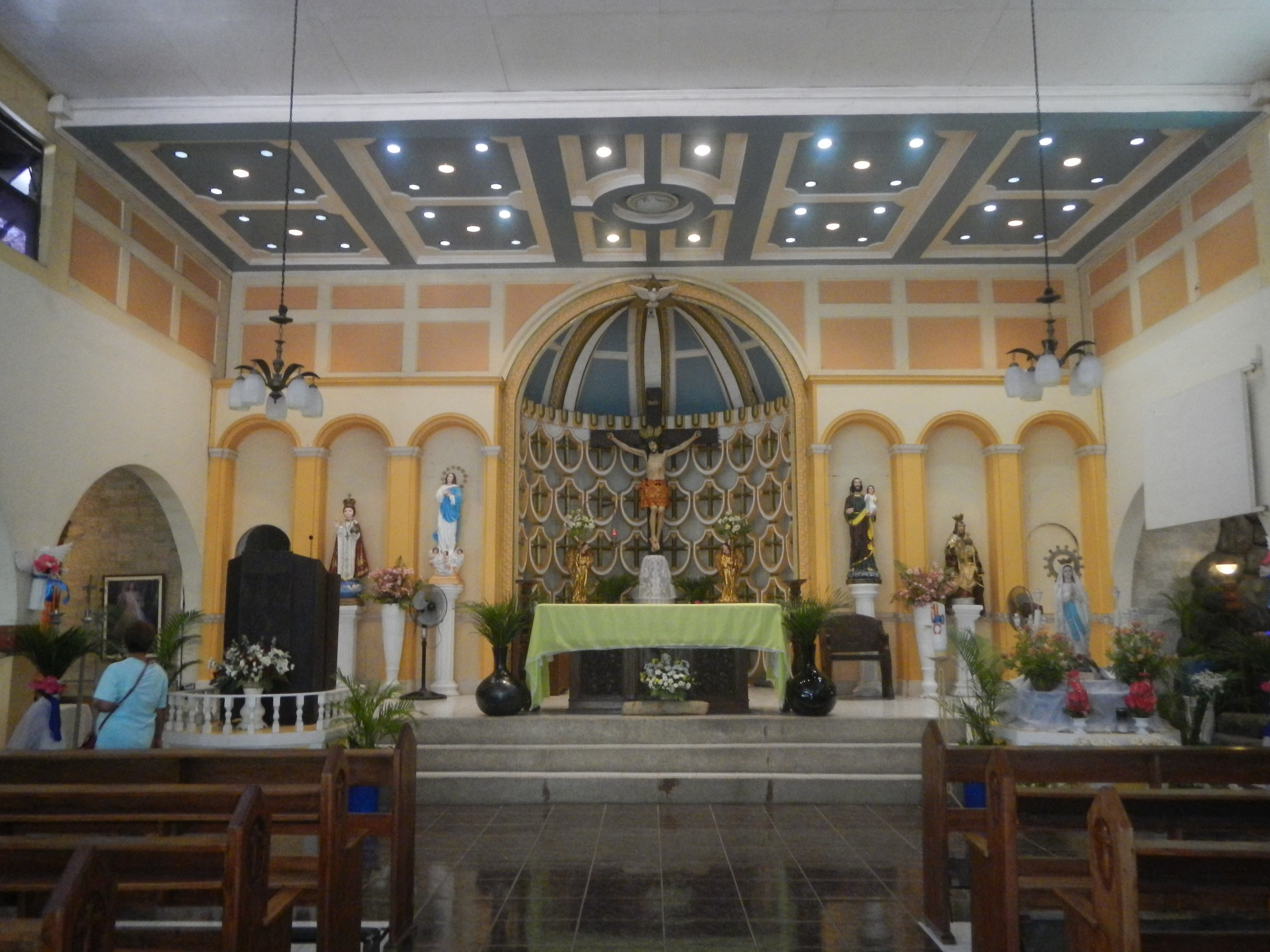
Our Lady of Lourdes Parish Church of Damortis

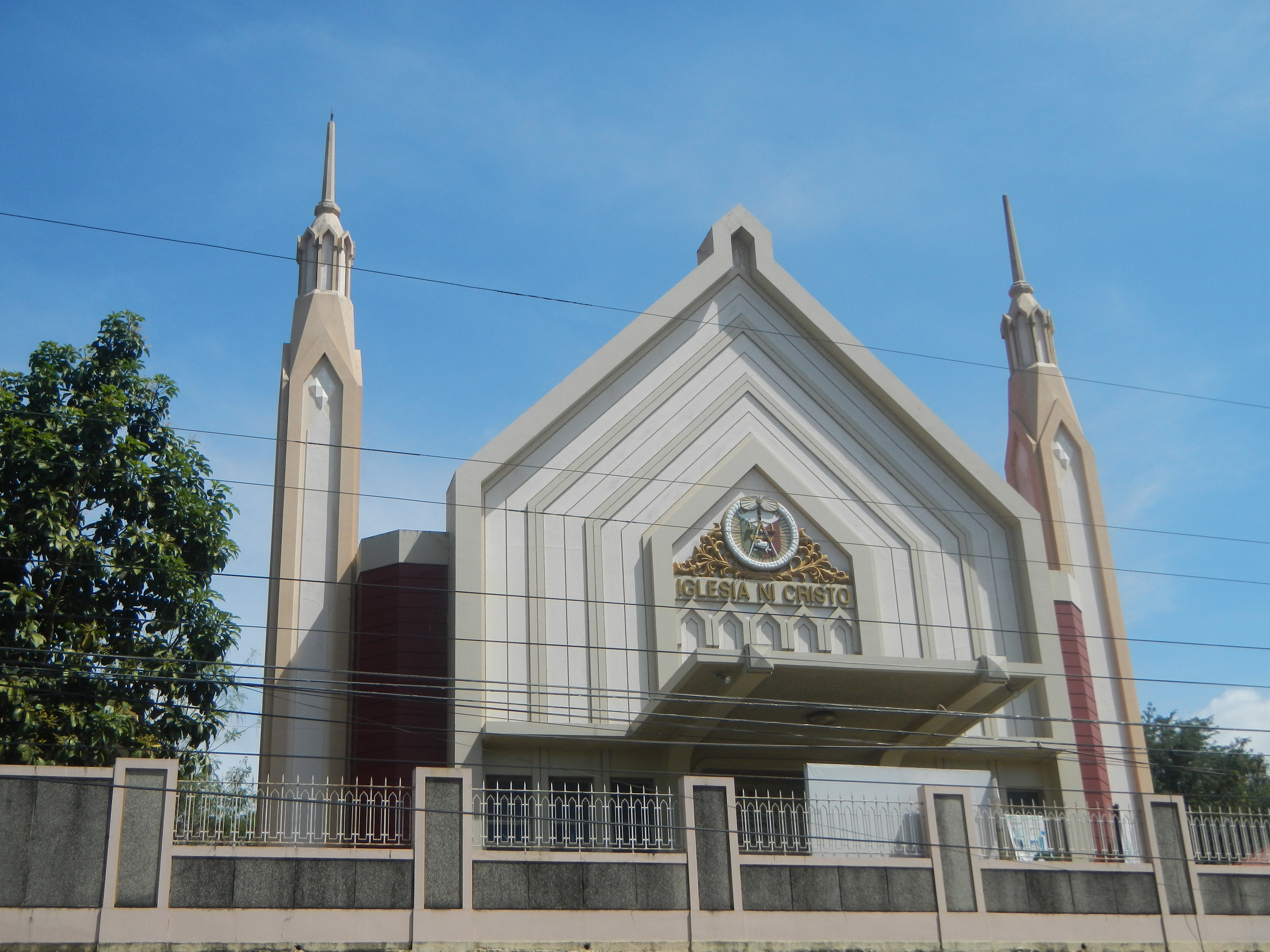
Iglesia ni Cristo

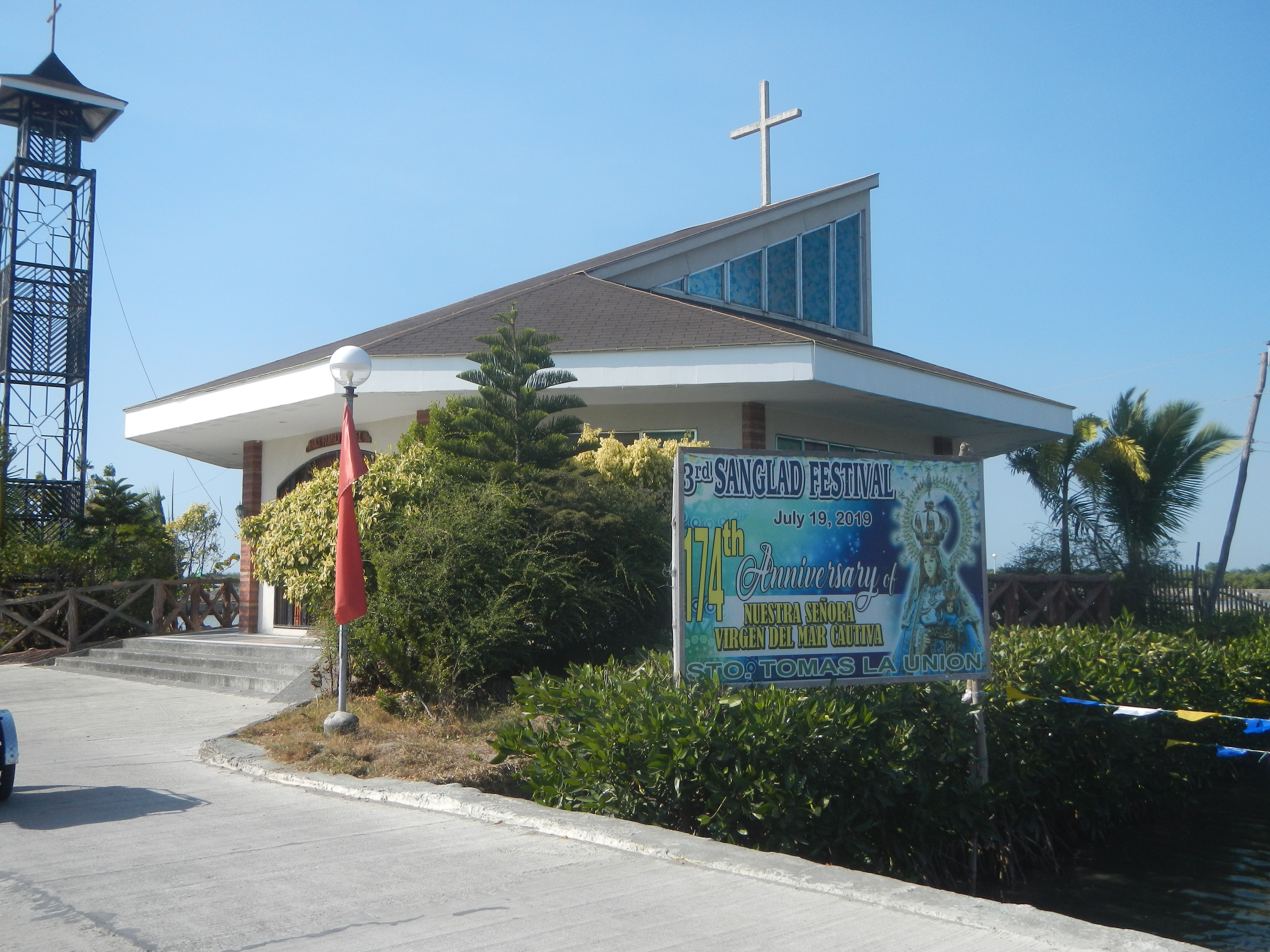
Holy Family Chapel of Raois

Santo Tomas is predominantly Roman Catholic, with significant populations adhering to other Christian denominations, including Iglesia ni Cristo, Protestantism, Aglipayan, Pentecostalism, and Jehovah’s Witnesses. The municipality also has smaller religious communities, including those practicing Islam and Buddhism.

== Education ==
The Santo Tomas Schools District Office governs all educational institutions within the municipality. It oversees the management and operations of all private and public elementary and high schools.

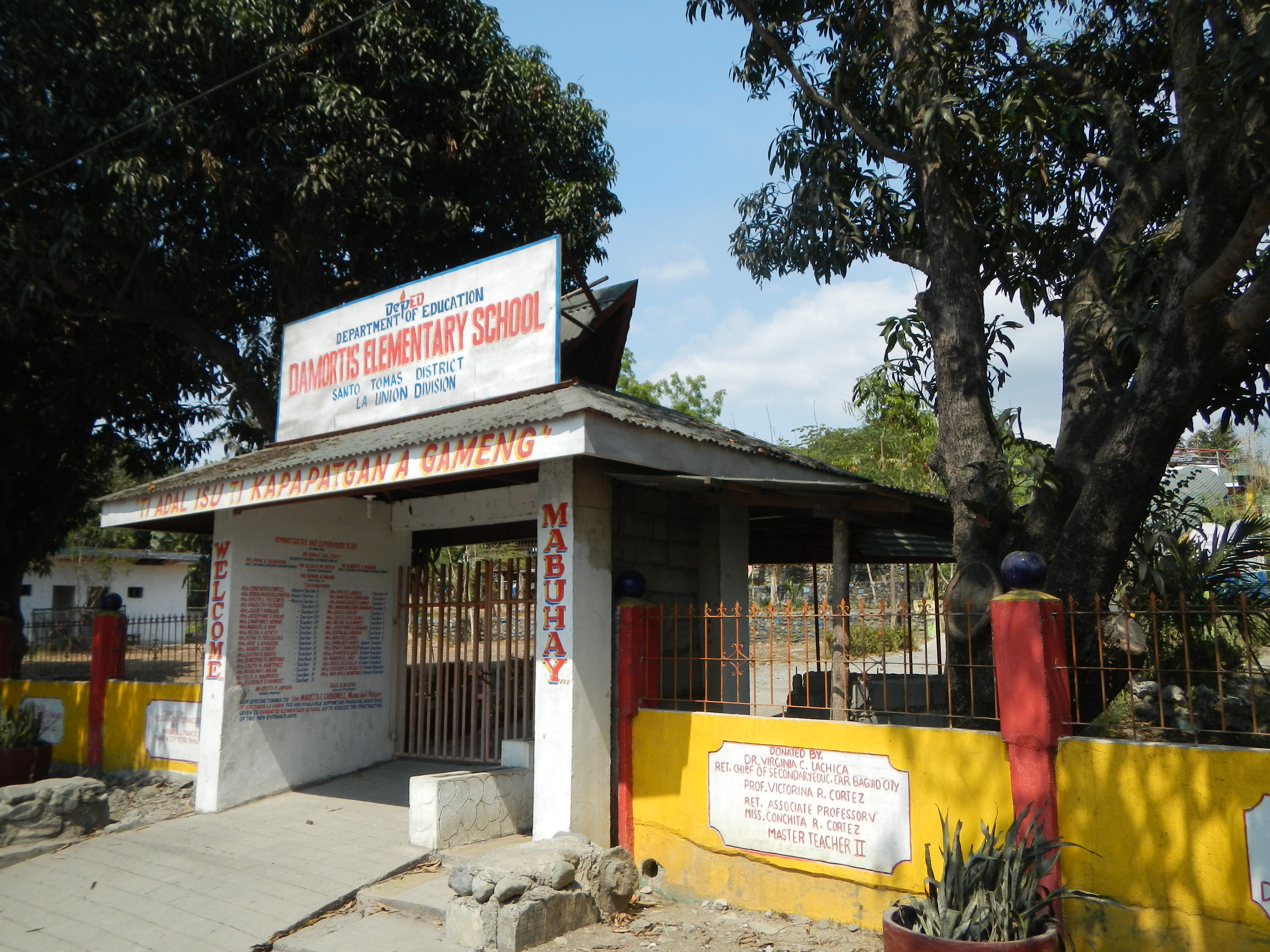
Damortis Elementary School

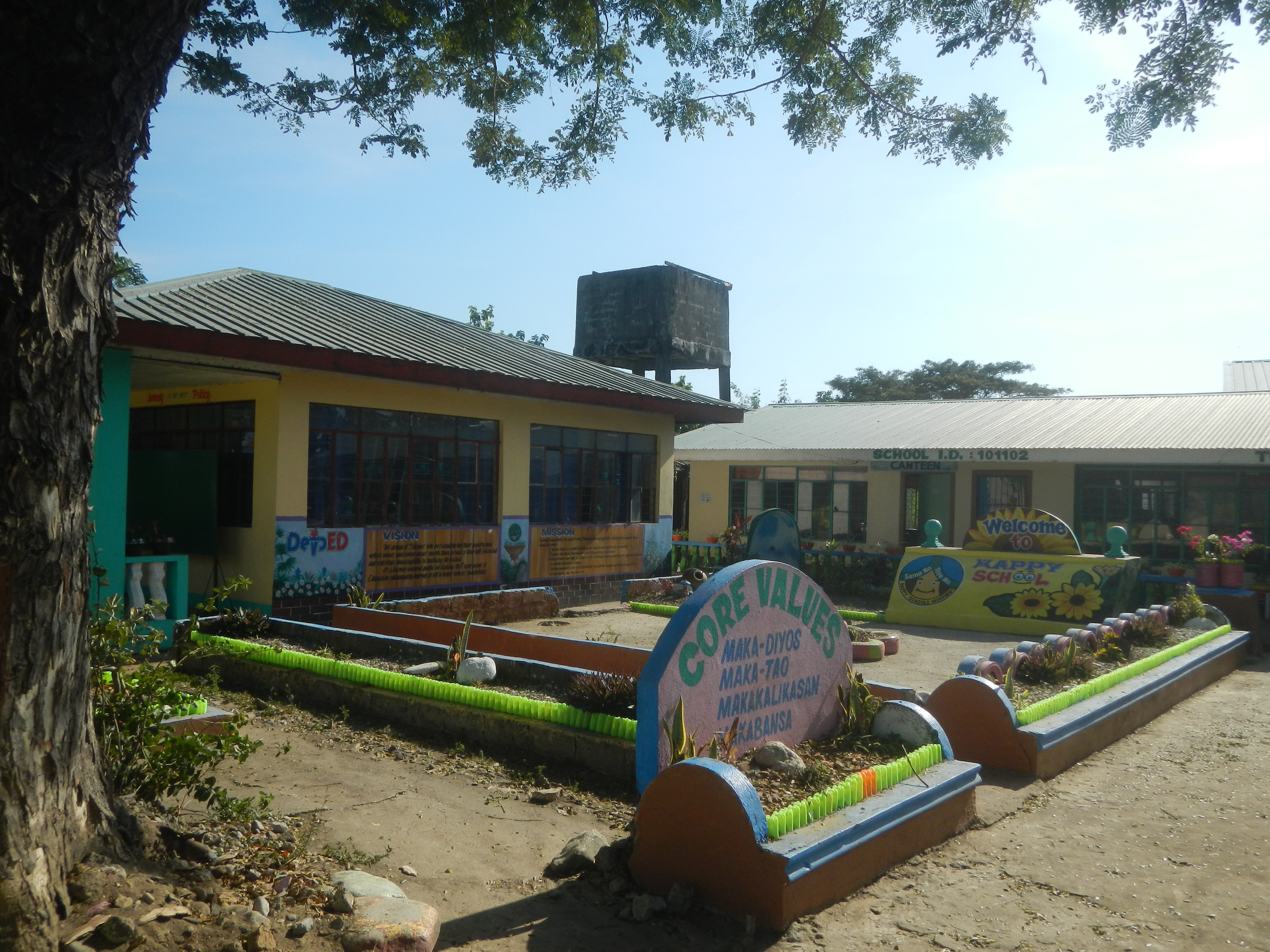
Tococ Elementary School

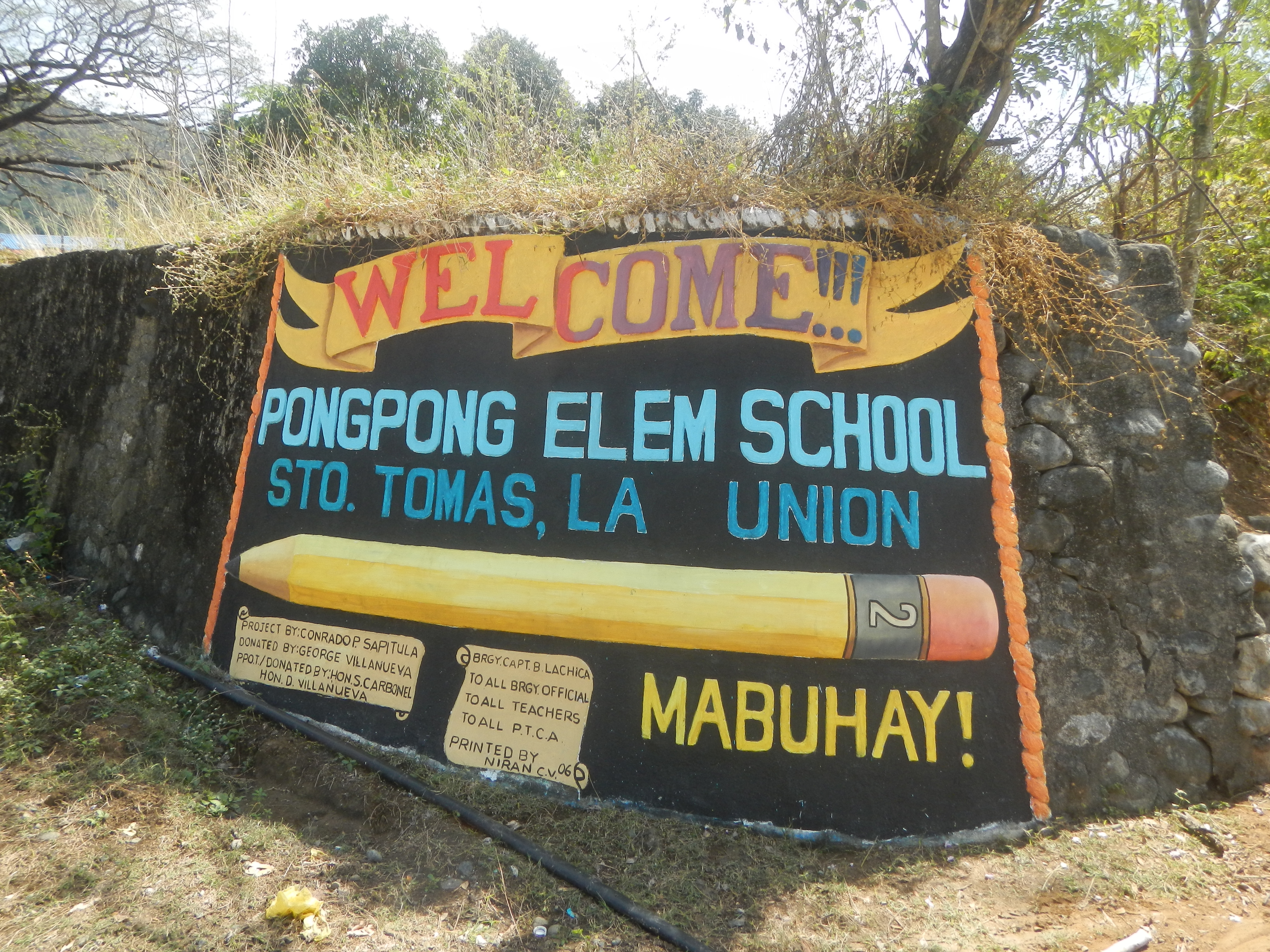
Pongpong Elementary School

In terms of educational attainment, more females than males in Santo Tomas reach higher levels of education. Among the household population aged five and older, 27.04% had attended or completed elementary education, 42.13% had completed high school, 9.91% were college undergraduates, and 13.88% held academic degrees. Of those with academic degrees, 55.72% were female and 44.28% were male. Additionally, more females (71.05%) than males (28.95%) pursued post-baccalaureate courses.

Santo Tomas has a literacy rate of 98.97% among its population aged five and older, with males having a higher literacy rate (50.78%) than females (49.22%).

Santo Tomas has 11 public elementary schools, 4 public secondary schools and 1 College under the Don Mariano Marcos Memorial State University-South La Union Campus.

=== Primary and elementary schools ===
- Ambitacay Elementary School
- Bail Elementary School
- Balaoc Elementary School
- Casilagan Elementary School
- Damortis Elementary School
- Fernando Elementary School
- Namboongan Elementary School
- Narvacan Elementary School
- Patac Elementary School
- Pongpong Elementary School
- Queensland Formation School
- Sacred Heart Learning Center
- St. Mary of the Sea Academy
- Sto. Tomas Central Elementary School
- Tococ Elementary School
- Ubagan Elementary School

=== Secondary schools ===
- Bail National High School
- Cabaruan Integrated School
- Cupang Integrated School
- Damortis National High School
- Sto. Tomas National High School

== Economy ==
Poverty incidence of Santo Tomas (%)

Source: Philippine Statistics Authority

=== Agriculture ===
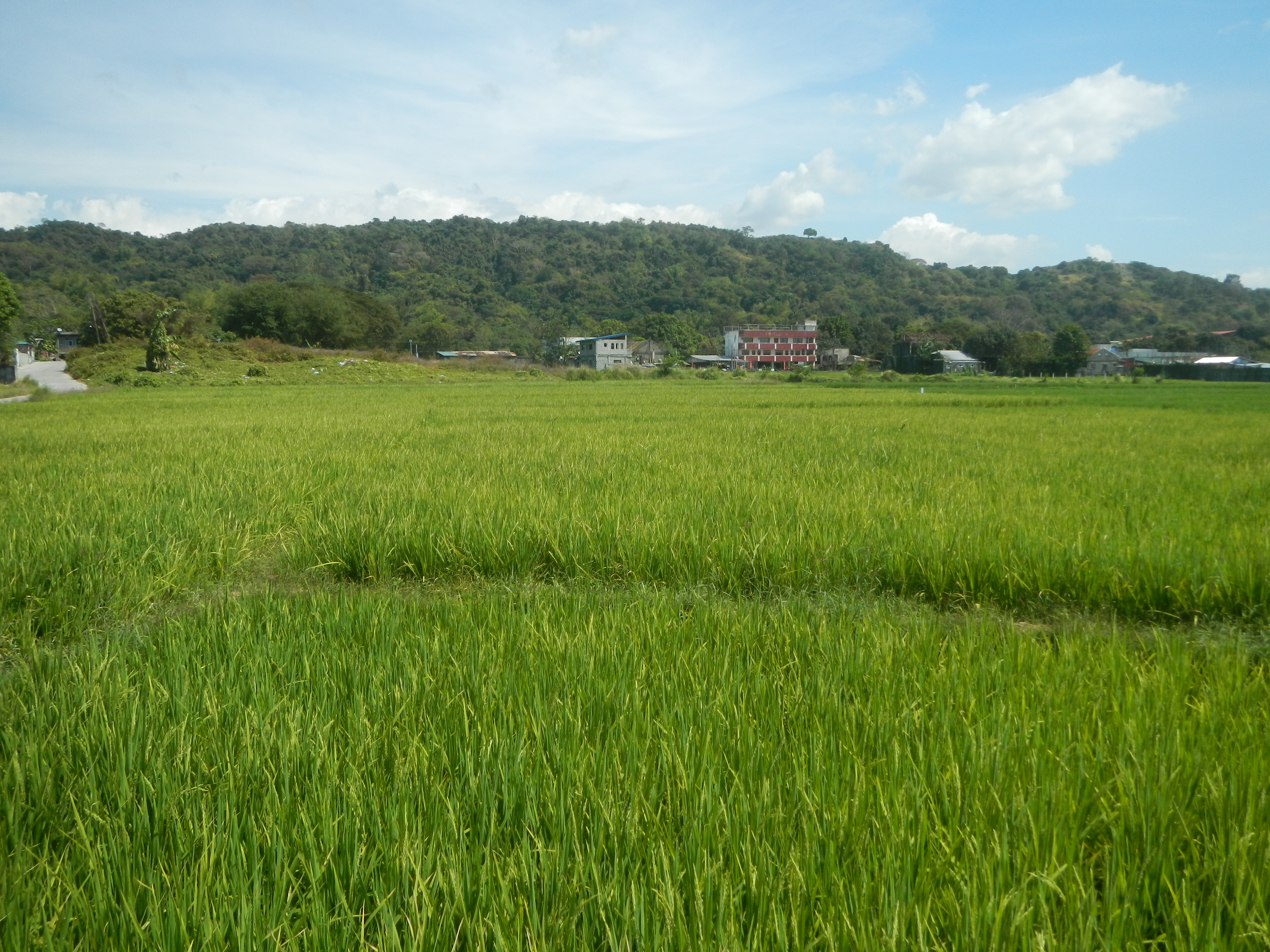
Paddy fields in Lomboy

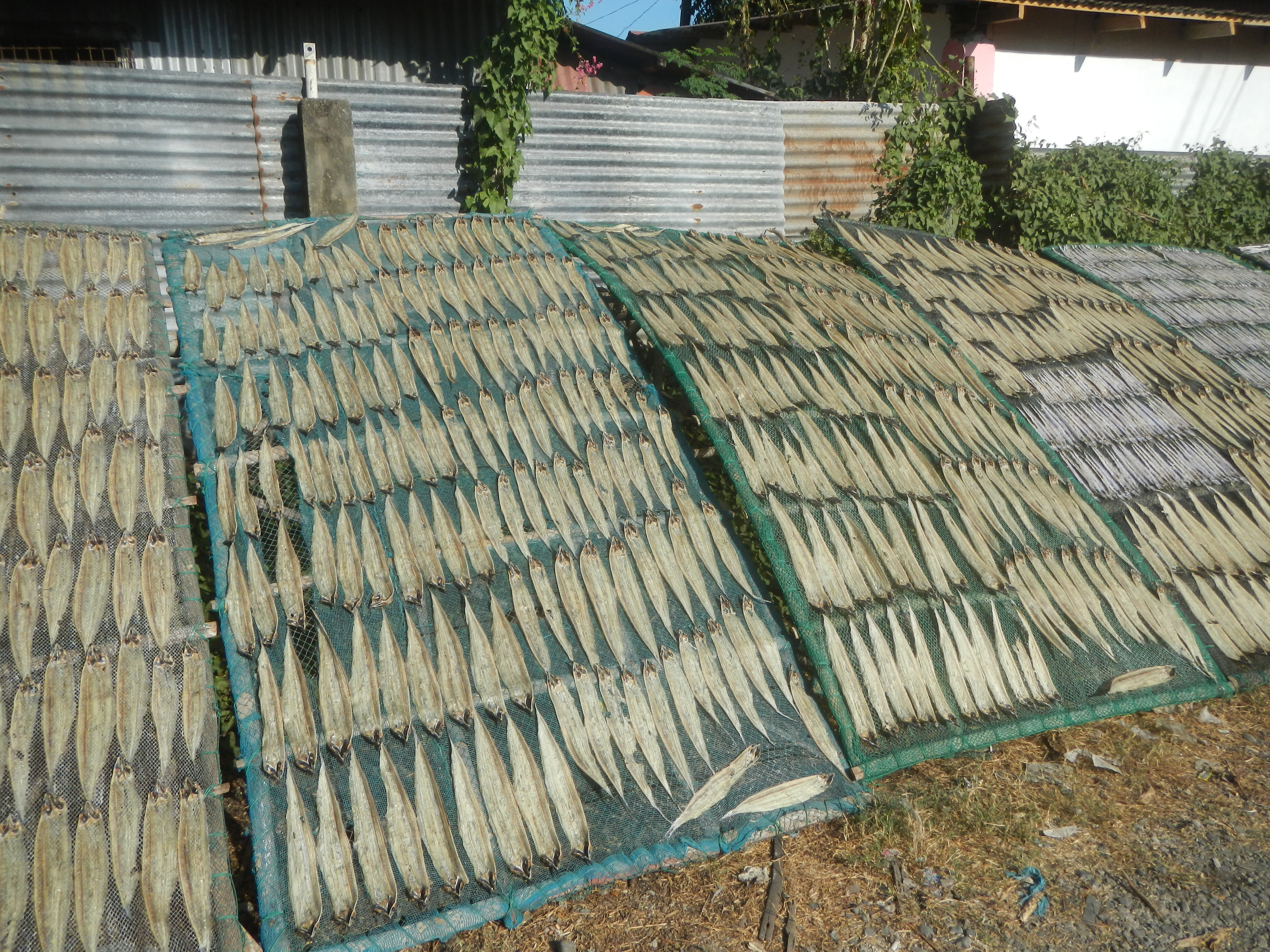
Dried fish production in Damortis

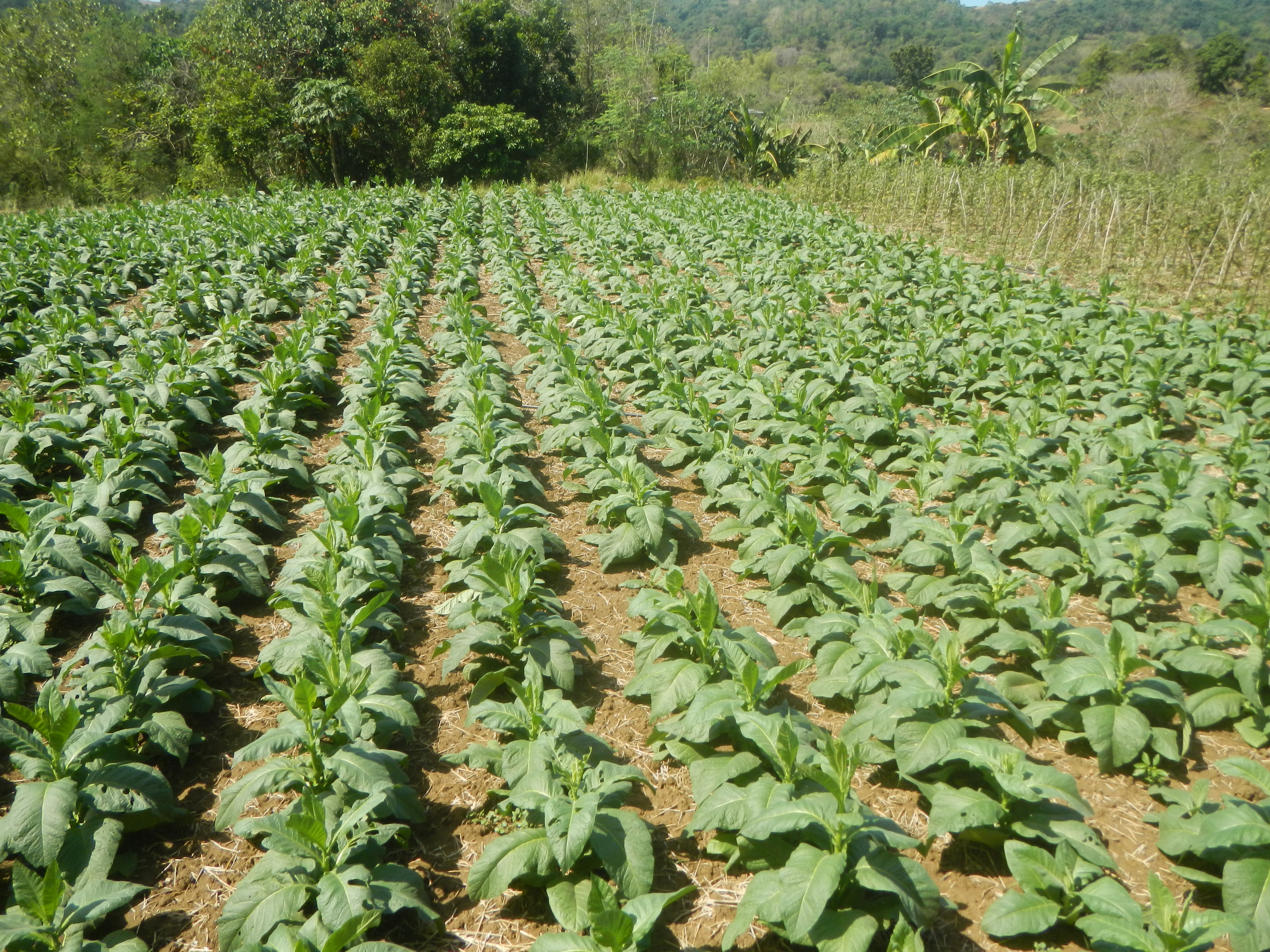
Tobacco in Casilagan

=== Industry ===
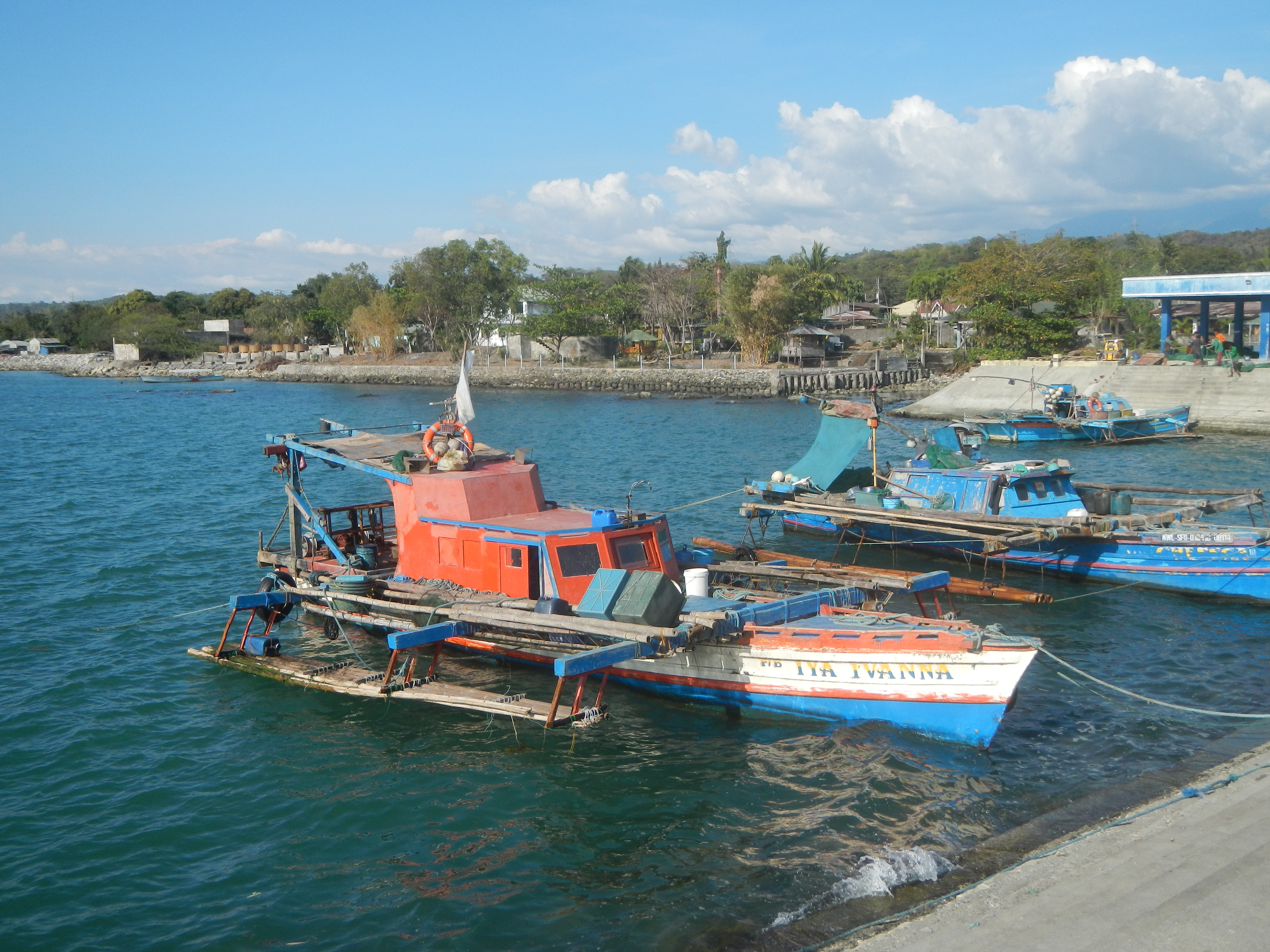
Fishing boats in Damortis

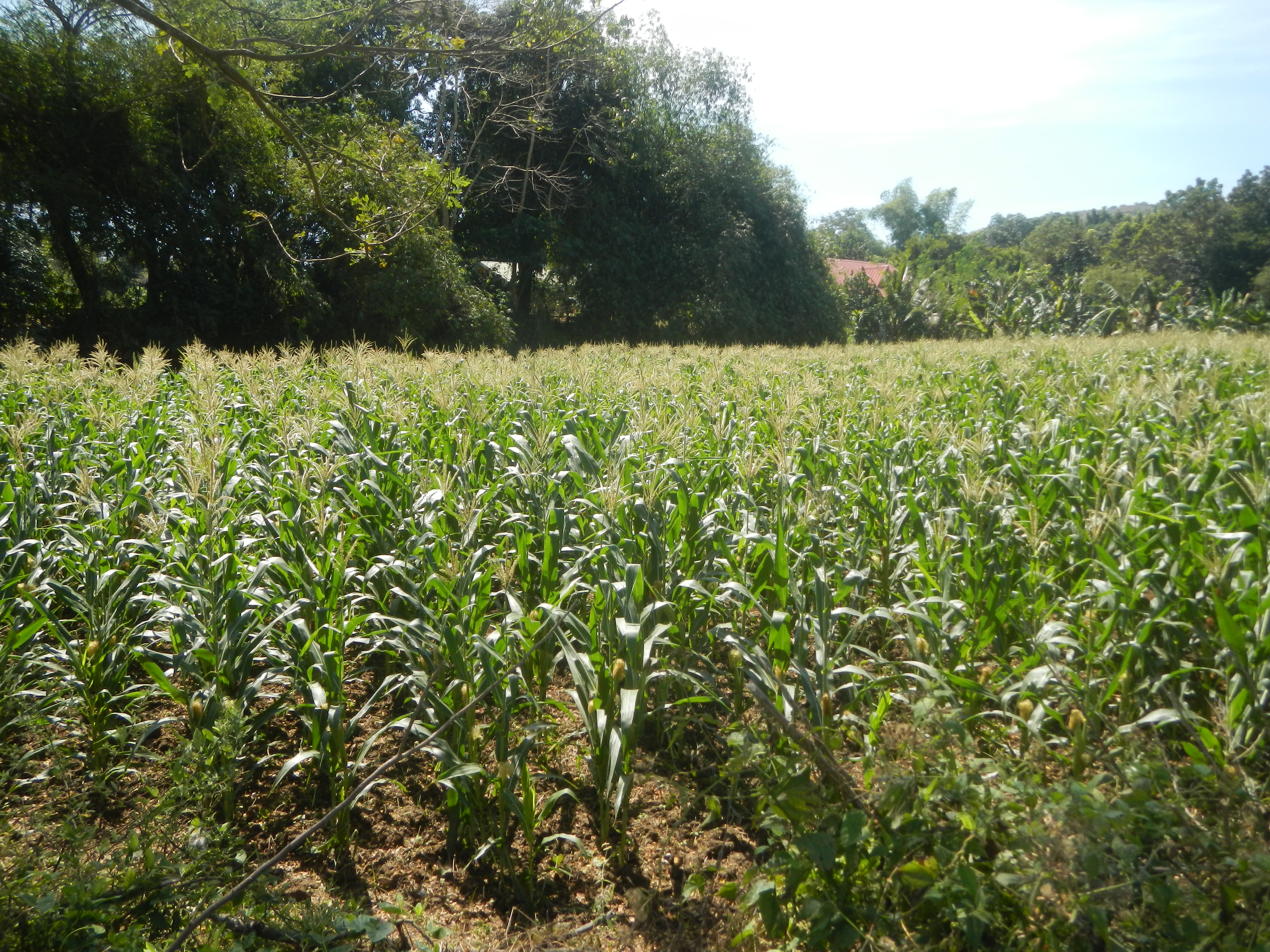
Maize field in Ambitacay

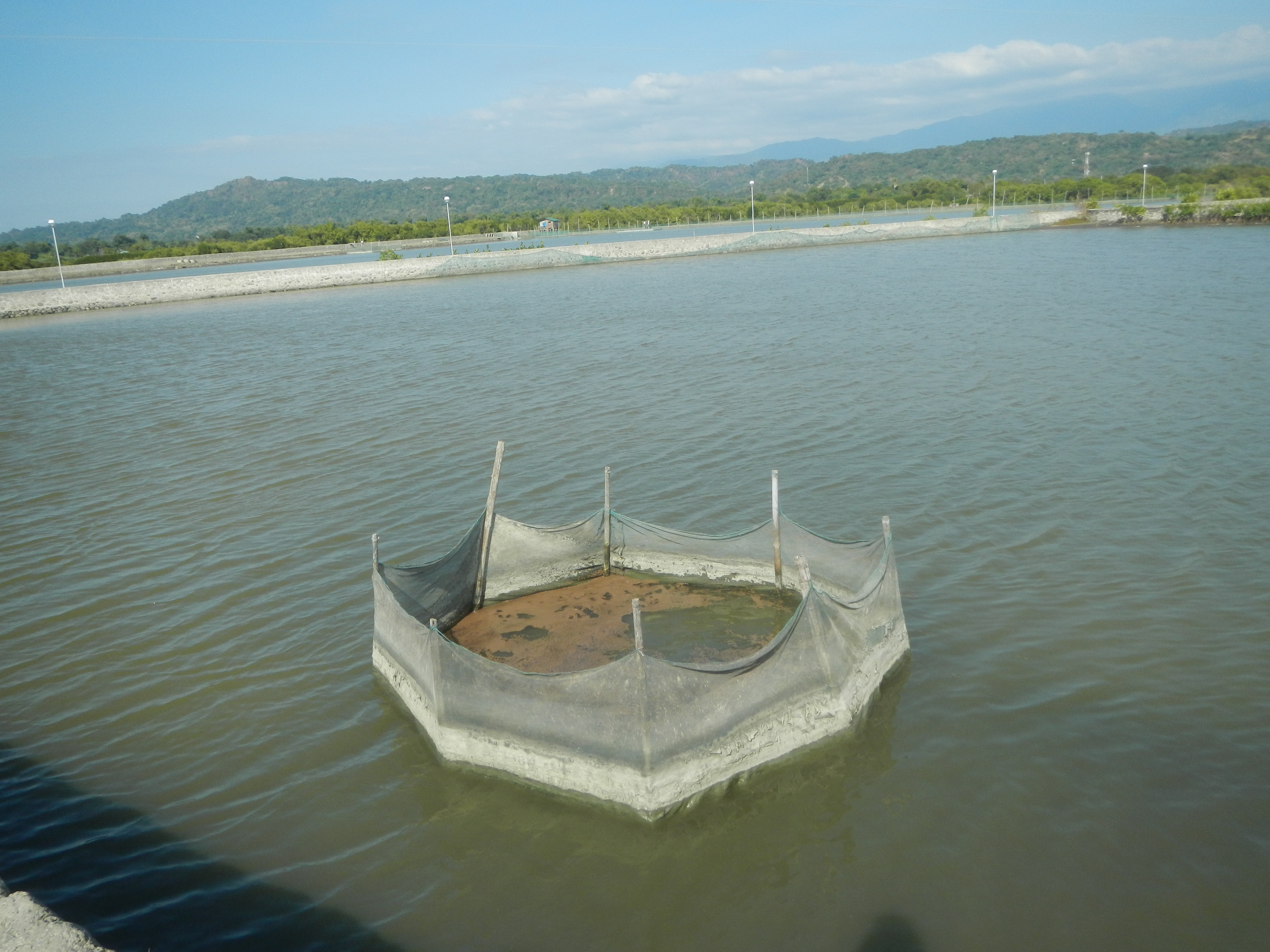
Fishpond in Raois

== Government ==
=== Local government ===
Santo Tomas is part of the second congressional district of the province of La Union. It is governed by a mayor designated as its local chief executive and by a municipal council as its legislative body in accordance with the Local Government Code. The mayor, vice mayor, and the councilors are elected directly by the people through an election which is being held every three years.

The Pamahalaang Bayan (Municipal Hall) is located on top of a hill.

=== Elected officials ===
Members of the Municipal Council (2019–2022)
Position	Name
Congressman	Sandra Y. Eriguel
Mayor	Severino C. Carbonell
Vice-Mayor	Winnie N. Doctolero
Councilors	Carlito M. Dela Cruz Jr.
Councilors	Anthony M. Villanueva
Councilors	Aldreyn S. Cabico
Councilors	Celiaflor M. Bejar
Councilors	Noel G. Basi
Councilors	Leonor J. Tagubat
Councilors	Lorenzo R. Medina Jr.
Councilors	Vilea R. Capinpin

== Tourism ==
Santo Tomas' coastal areas are suitable for fishing. Local cuisine includes Damortis dried fish (daing stalls along the national highway), puto, Bibingka, Nilatekan, and Patopat.

The town holds the Daing Festival every April 20 and an annual town Fiesta every April 24 and 25.

Santo Thomas contains part of the Agoo–Damortis Protected Landscape and Seascape. In 2002, a plan to create a 10 hectare BFAR Mariculture Park within the town was launched.

Santo Tomas is a DENR-designated Regional Center for Inland Fisheries Research and contains an Institute of Fisheries. The town's "Nutri-Enriched Seaweed Noodles" earned first place in the Aquatic Technology Competition and Marketplace, Phil. Council Aquaculture and Marine Research and Development on January 28, 2010.

The barangay of Damortis is known as the 'Tabo-an of the North’ because of its priceless 'danggit' (often associated with the small malaga), the dalag-baybay, espada, sapsap, pusit, turay, dilis, and shrimp, a local fish, 1 foot basasong, dried bangus (milkfish), patis (fish sauce), alamang, and bagoong.

=== Shrine of Nuestra Señora del Mar Cautiva Parish Church ===
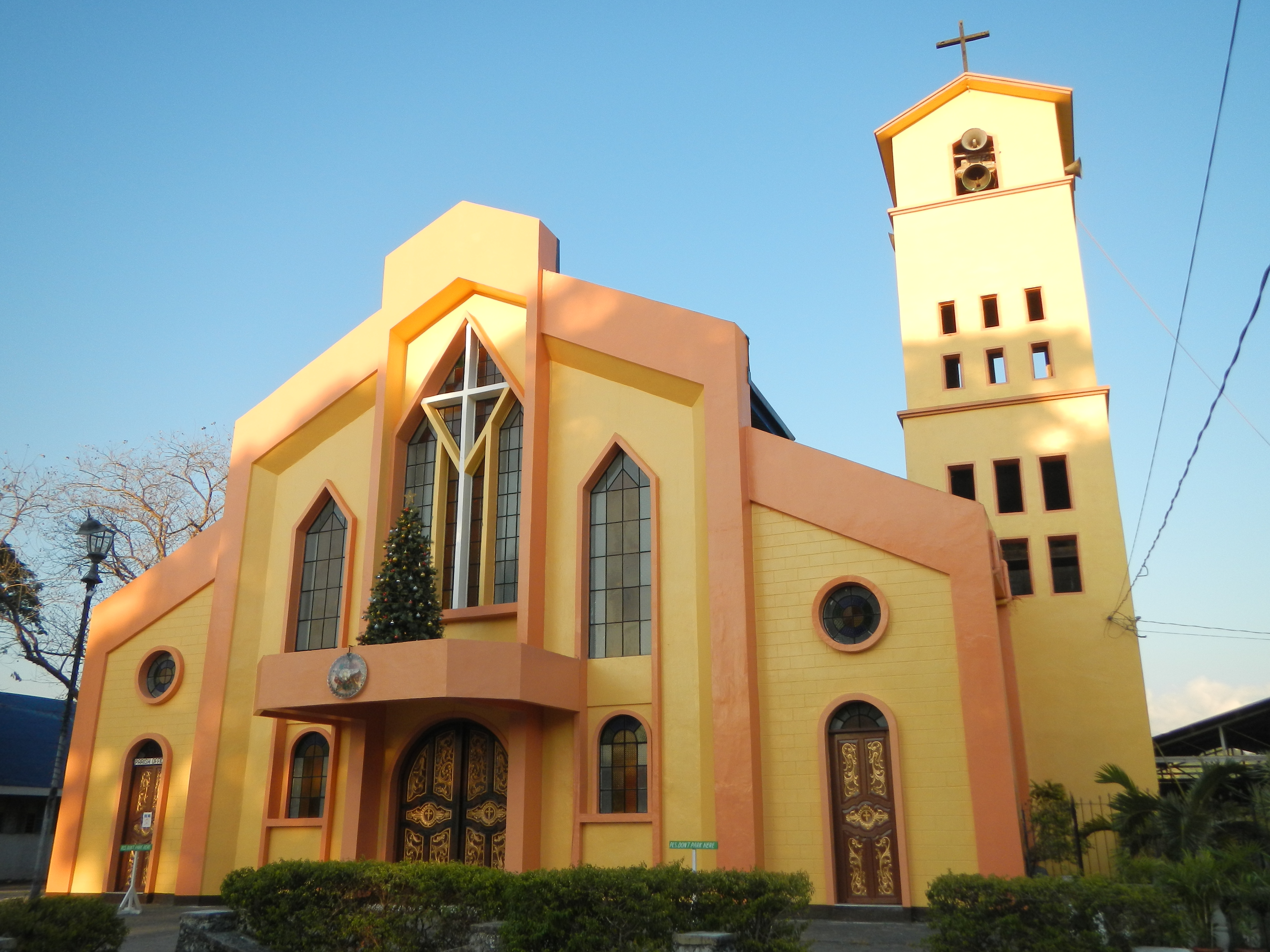
Shrine of Nuestra Señora del Mar Cautiva Parish Church

Religion plays an important role in the town's culture. The patron saint of the town fishermen is Senora Virgen del Mar Cautiva (Virgin of the Sea), whose Feast Day is celebrated every 26 April) at Poblacion.

One of Santo Tomas' cultural icons is the 1785 Holy Guardian Angels Parish Church, which celebrates the Patronal Fiesta on October 2. Its Parish Priests are Father Raul S. Panay and Fr. Emmanuel Bahiwag under the Vicariate of St. Francis Xavier under Vicar Forane, Fr. Joel Angelo Licos, under the jurisdiction of the Diocese of San Fernando de La Union (Latin: Dioecesis Ferdinandopolitanus ab Unione, Suffragan of Lingayen – Dagupan), a diocese of the Latin Catholic Church in the Philippines. The diocese was established in 1970 from the Archdiocese of Nueva Segovia.

In 1845, Father Santiago Romero carved three religious statues for the Church out of devotion to the "Virgin of the Rosaries". The statues depicted the Blessed Mother, St. Michael the Archangel, and the Holy Guardian Angels (patron of the Church). "Matutina" through the China Sea is held yearly on July, where the three images are inserted in three boxes and delivered to Santo Tomas by sailboat. In Bolinao, Pangasinan, Jolo pirates seized the "Matutina" and threw the three boxes of the statues into the sea, after severing the left forearm of the Virgin Mary. Although two of the boxes sank, the Virgin's allegedly remained dry and floated to the parish priest of Santo Tomas. The surviving statue was enthroned at the Church on July 19, 1845, amid reports of miracles, conversions, and healing. Augustinian friar Padre Lorenzo Rodriguez created a replacement arm for the statue out of gold and then a second out of ivory. Today, the ivory arm is displayed on the statue, fastened to it with string.

== Gallery ==
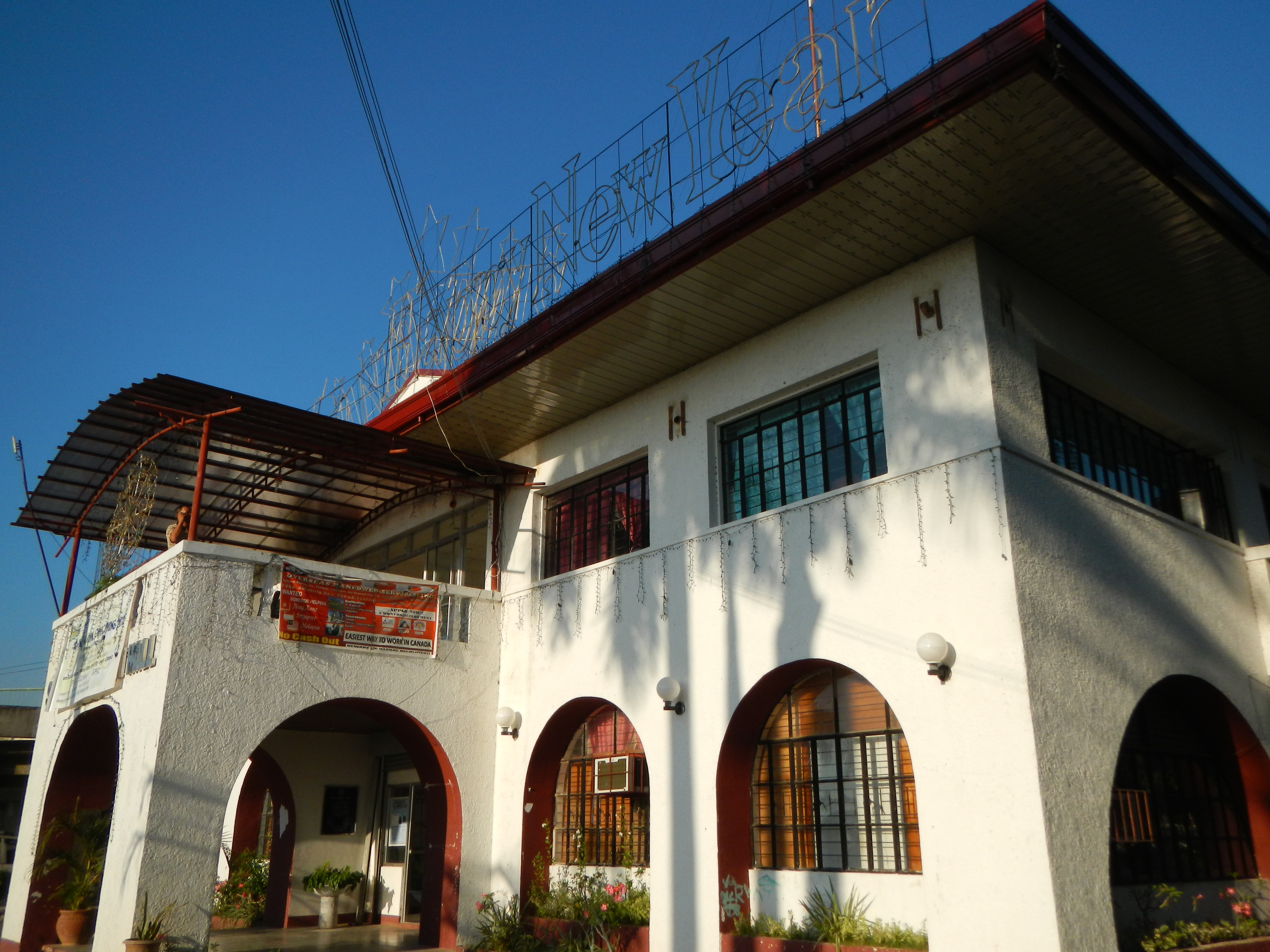
Municipal Hall

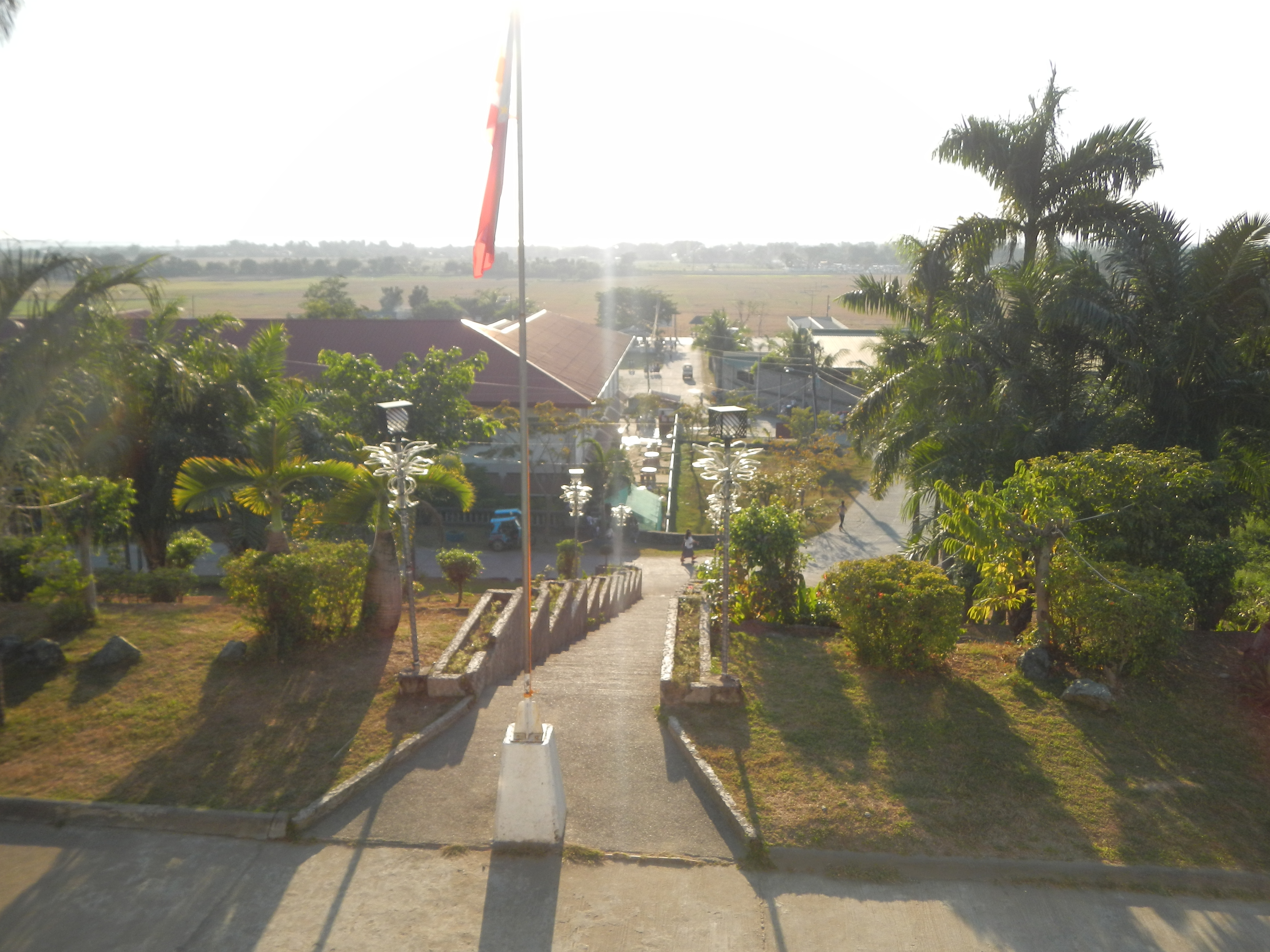
View of downtown from Town Hall hill top

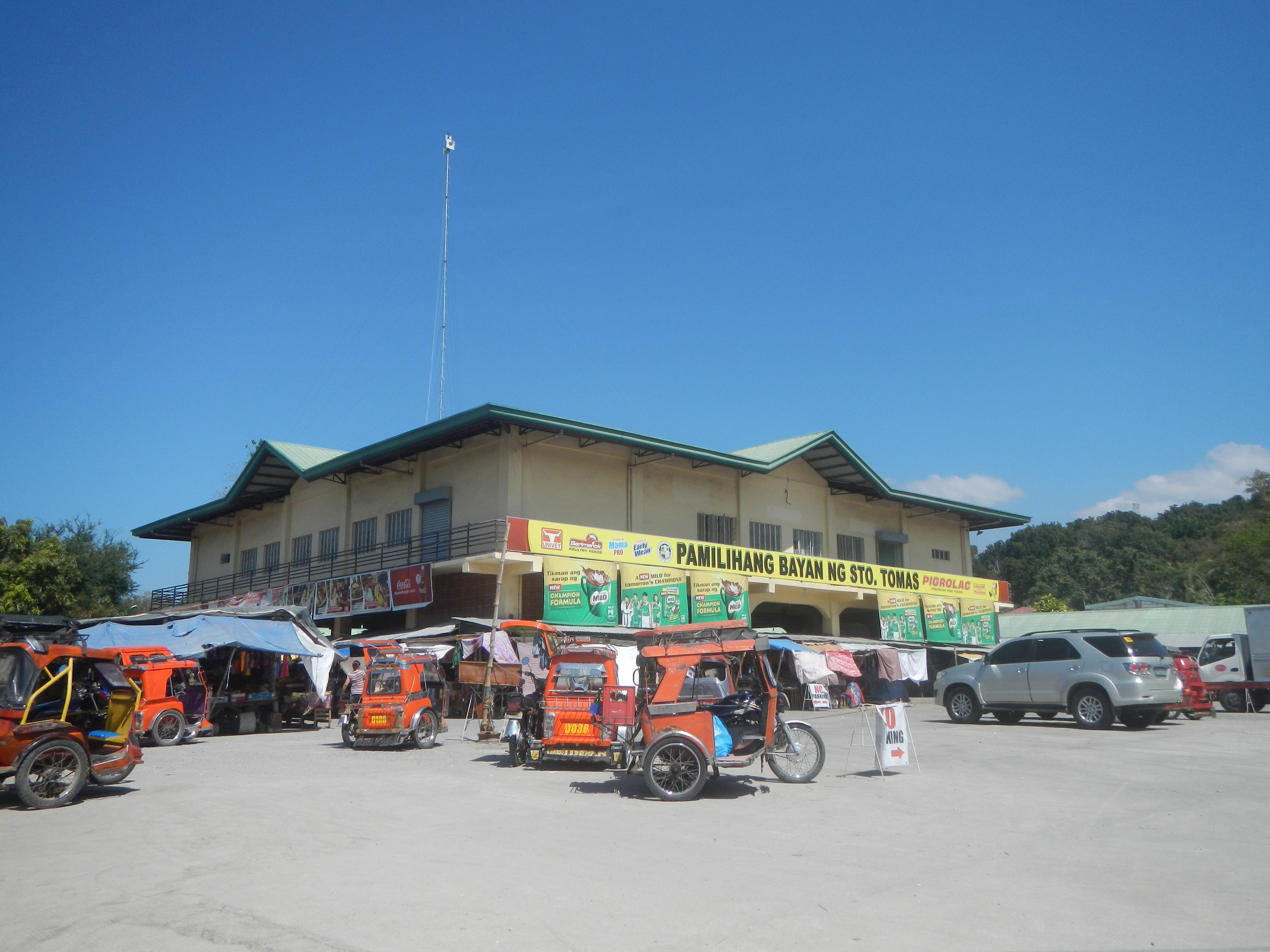
Santo Tomas Public Market

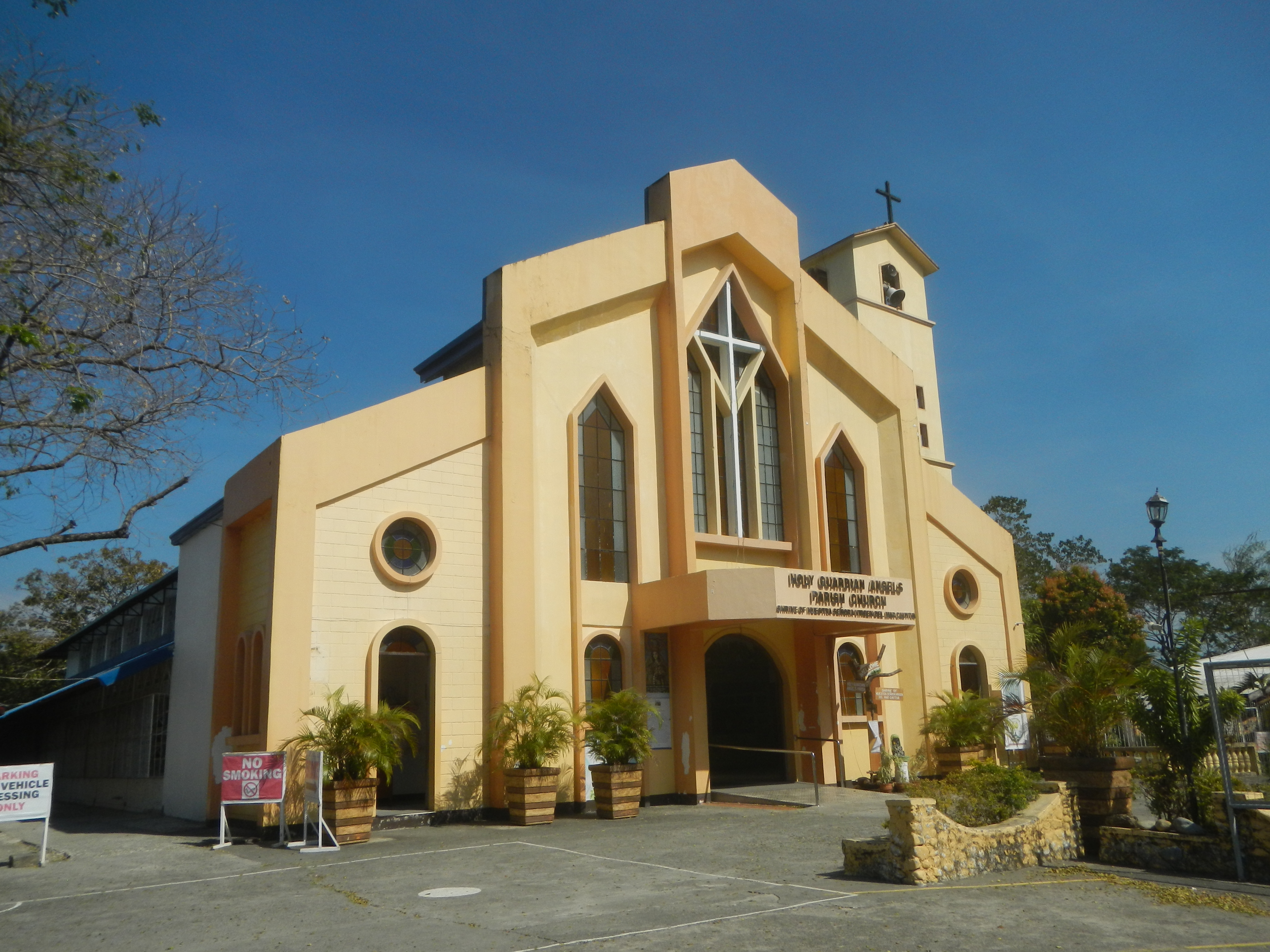
Shrine of Nuestra Señora Virgen del Mar Cautiva

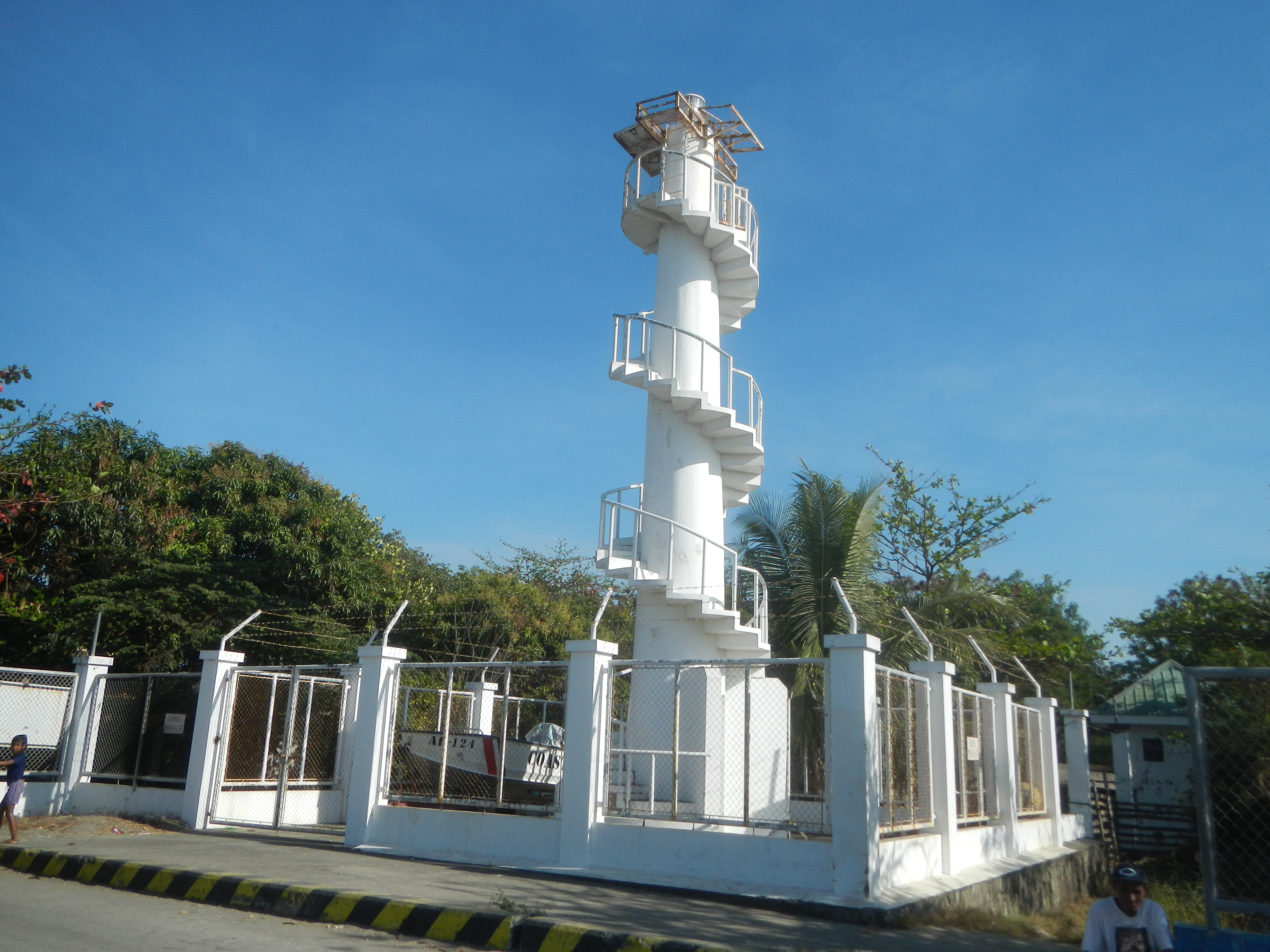
Santo Tomas Lighthouse

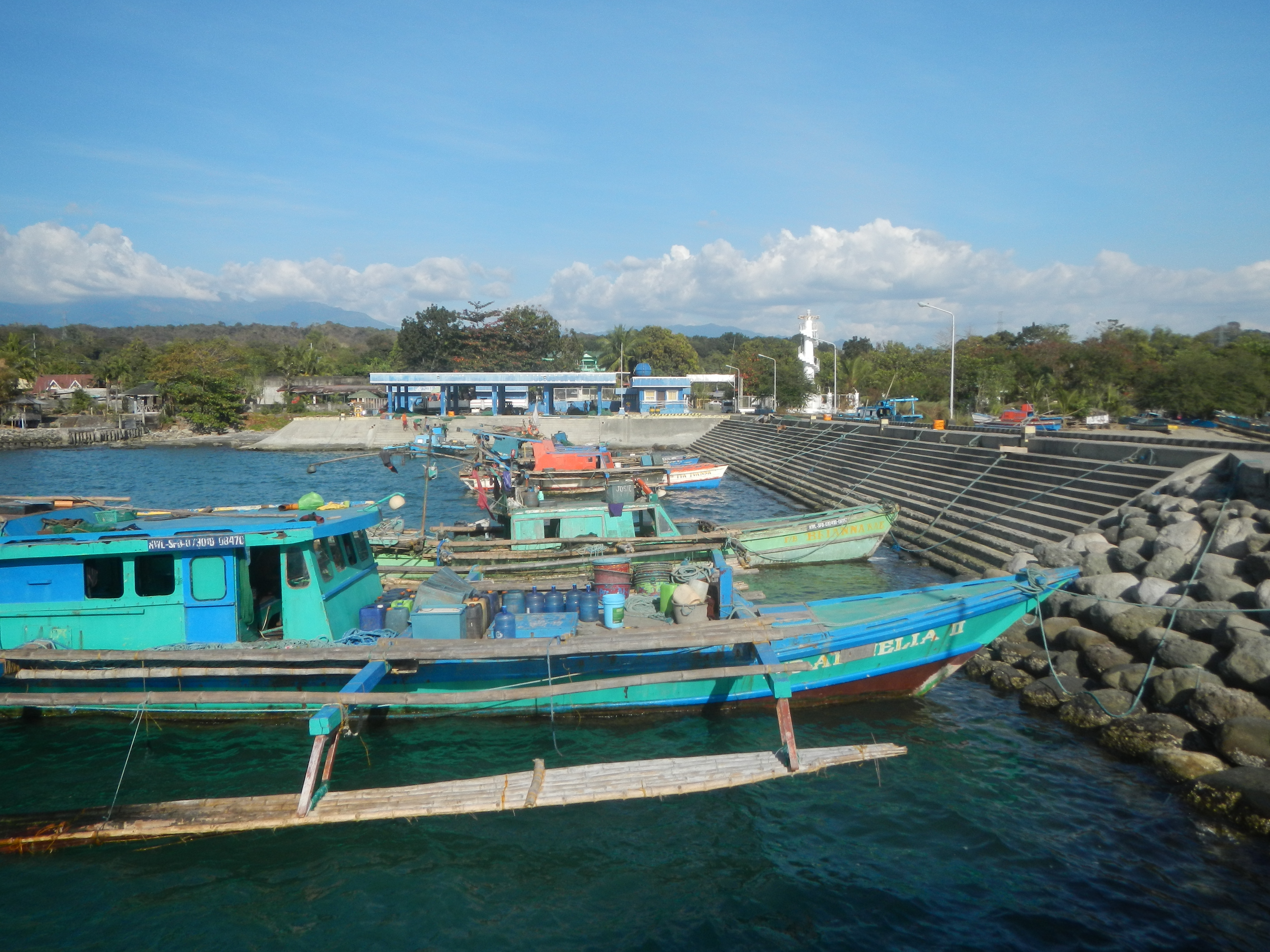
Damortis Port

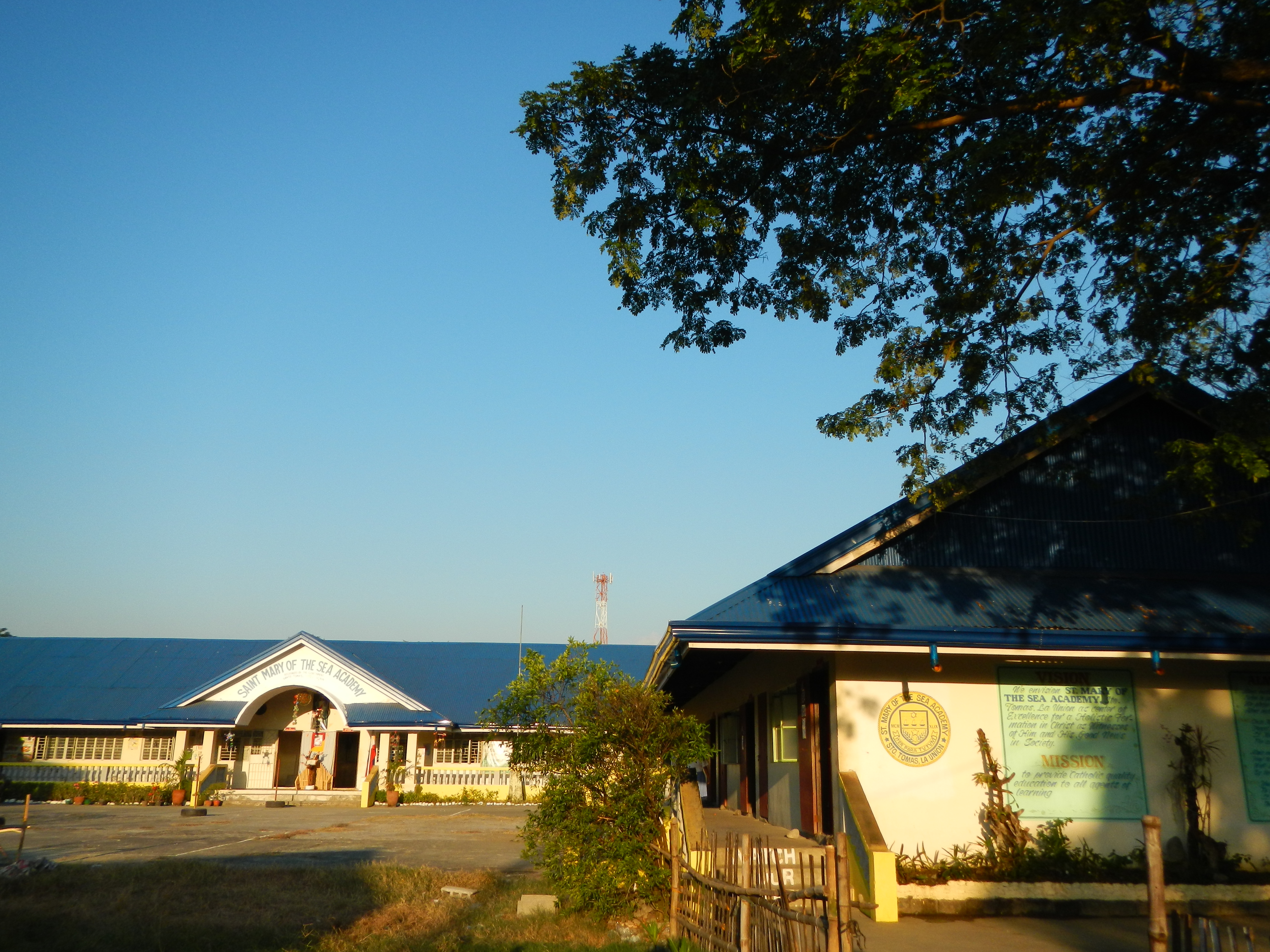
St. Mary of the Sea Academy

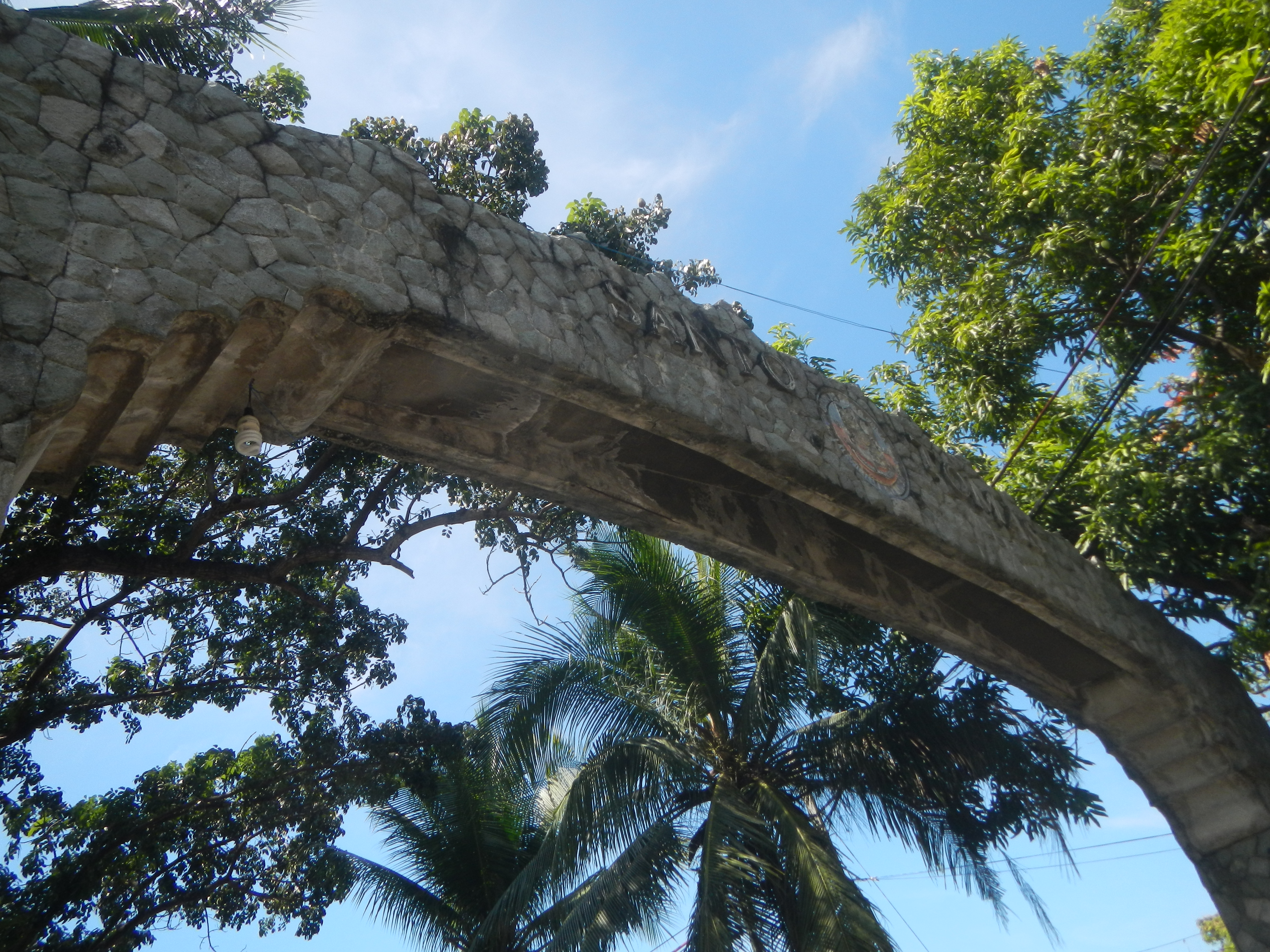
Santo Tomas Welcome Arch

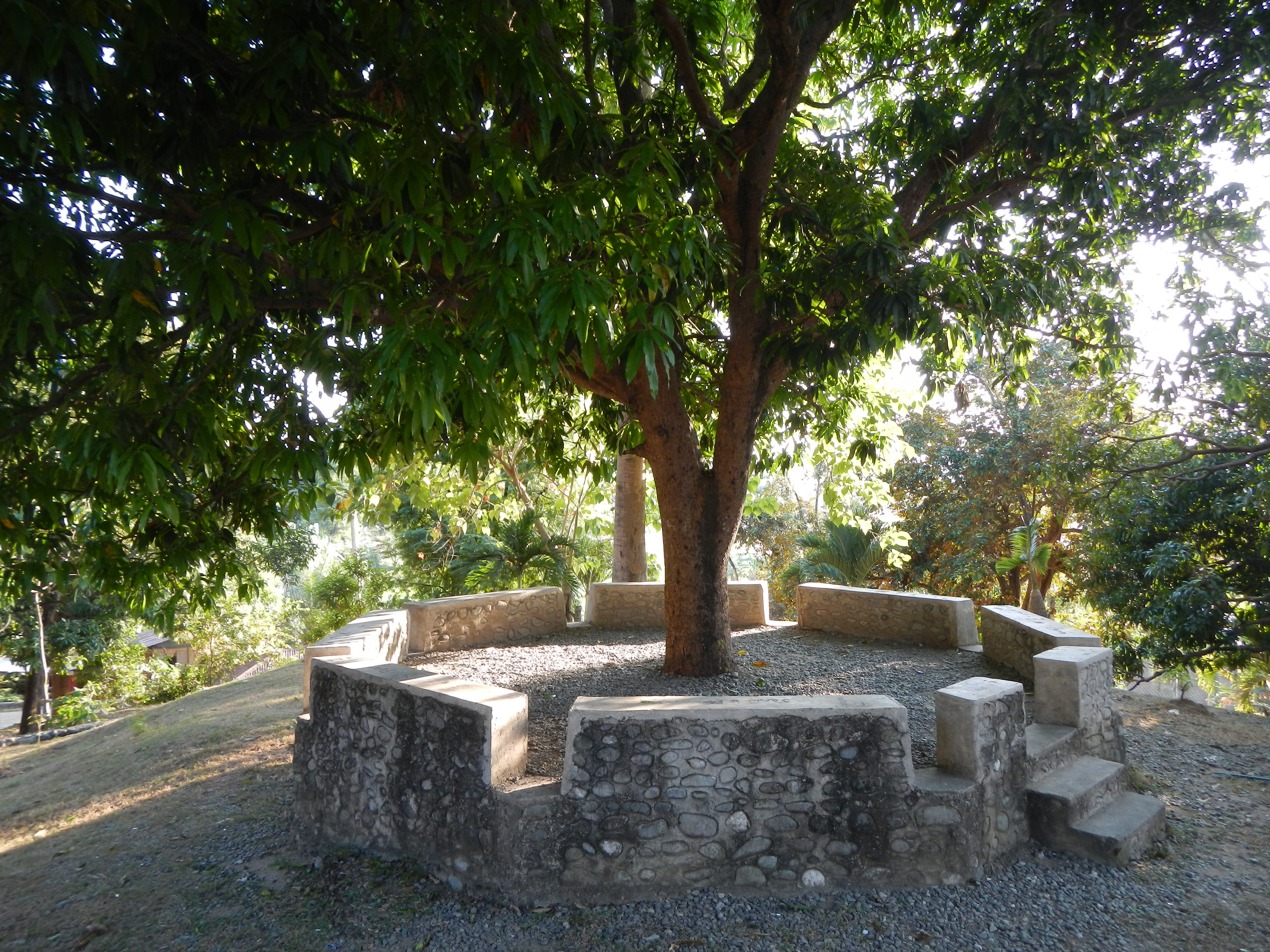
The Town Plaza
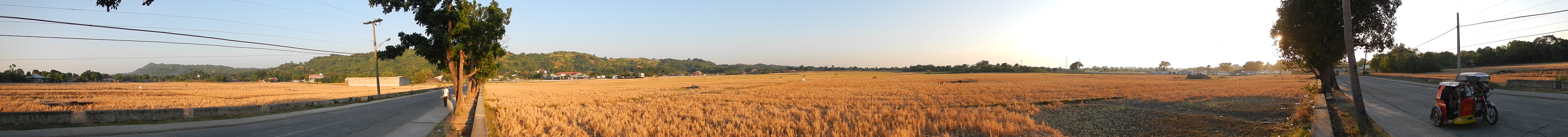
Panoramic view of Santo Tomas
