= Bued River =

River in Luzon, Philippines

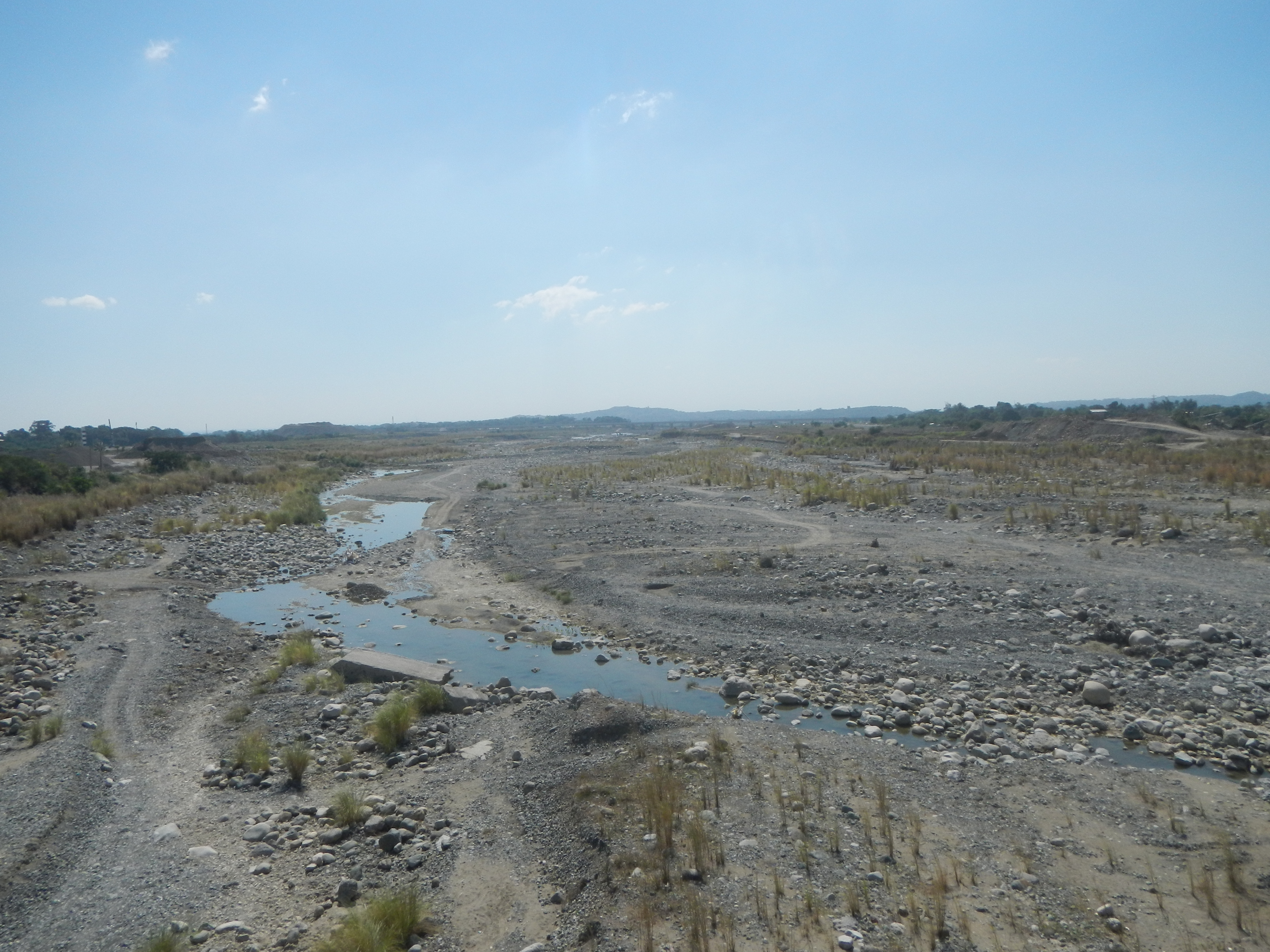
- The heavily silted dry riverbed along Sison in Pangasinan

- Location in Luzon Location in the Philippines

Location
- Country: Philippines
- Region: Cordillera Administrative Region; Ilocos Region
- Province: Benguet; Pangasinan; La Union
- City/municipality: Baguio; Tuba; Pugo; Rosario; Sison; Pozorrubio; San Jacinto; Mangaldan; San Fabian; Dagupan

Physical characteristics
- Source: Cordillera mountains
  - location: Baguio, Benguet
  - elevation: 6,400 ft (2,000 m)
- Mouth: Cayanga River
  - location: Mangaldan, Pangasinan
  - coordinates: 16°04′49″N 120°24′56″E
  - elevation: 0 ft (0 m)
- Length: 80 km (50 mi)
- Basin size: 641 km^{2} (247 sq mi)

Basin features
- Progression: Bued–Cayanga

The Bued River is a river in the island of Luzon in the Philippines with a total length of 80 km (50 mi). It covers primarily the provinces of Benguet and Pangasinan, and a few parts of La Union. The river originates from the city of Baguio and joins with the Angalacan River in the municipality of Mangaldan, Pangasinan to form the Cayanga River.

== Course ==
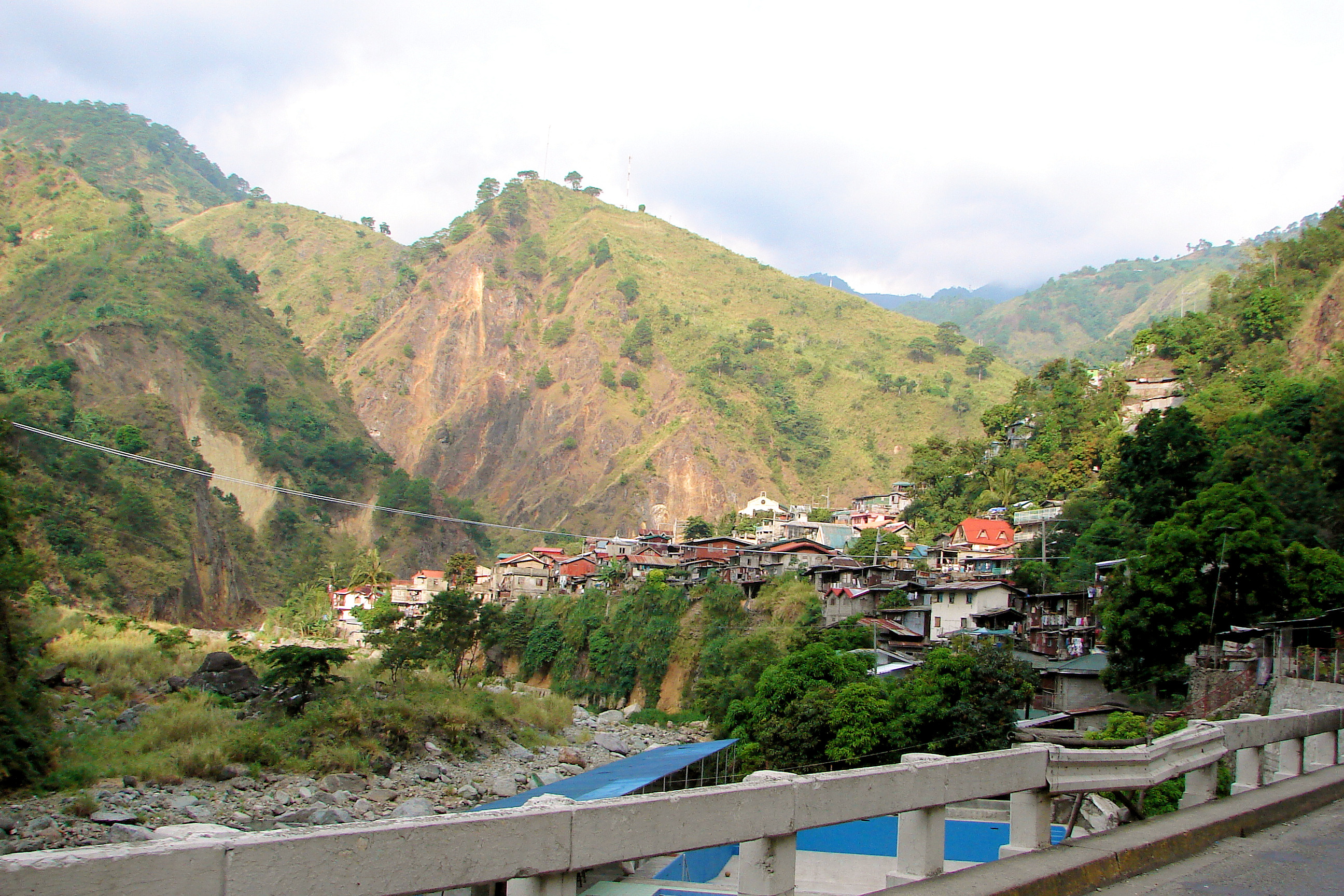
Upstream Bued River bed overlooking Camp 6 along Kennon Road

The headwaters of the Bued River are formed in the southeastern portion of Baguio, where it covers 25 of its barangays. It then traverses the municipality of Tuba along the foot of the Santo Tomas mountain range, where several tributary creeks join the river. The river enters the municipality of Sison upon reaching barangay Dungon, where the river begins to be heavily silted. A river dike has been constructed in the barangays of Artacho, Cauringan, Esperanza, and Poblacion Norte to prevent flowing into the town center. It enters the town of San Fabian upon reaching the barangay of Ambalangan-Dalin, then traverses the town of Pozorrubio, Pangasinan along barangay Balacag. It reaches San Jacinto along with barangay Santa Cruz and enters the town of Mangaldan upon reaching the barangay of Biagtan, where it merges with the Anglican River to form the Cayanga River, which empties into Lingayen Gulf at the border between San Fabian and the city of Dagupan.

== Siltation ==
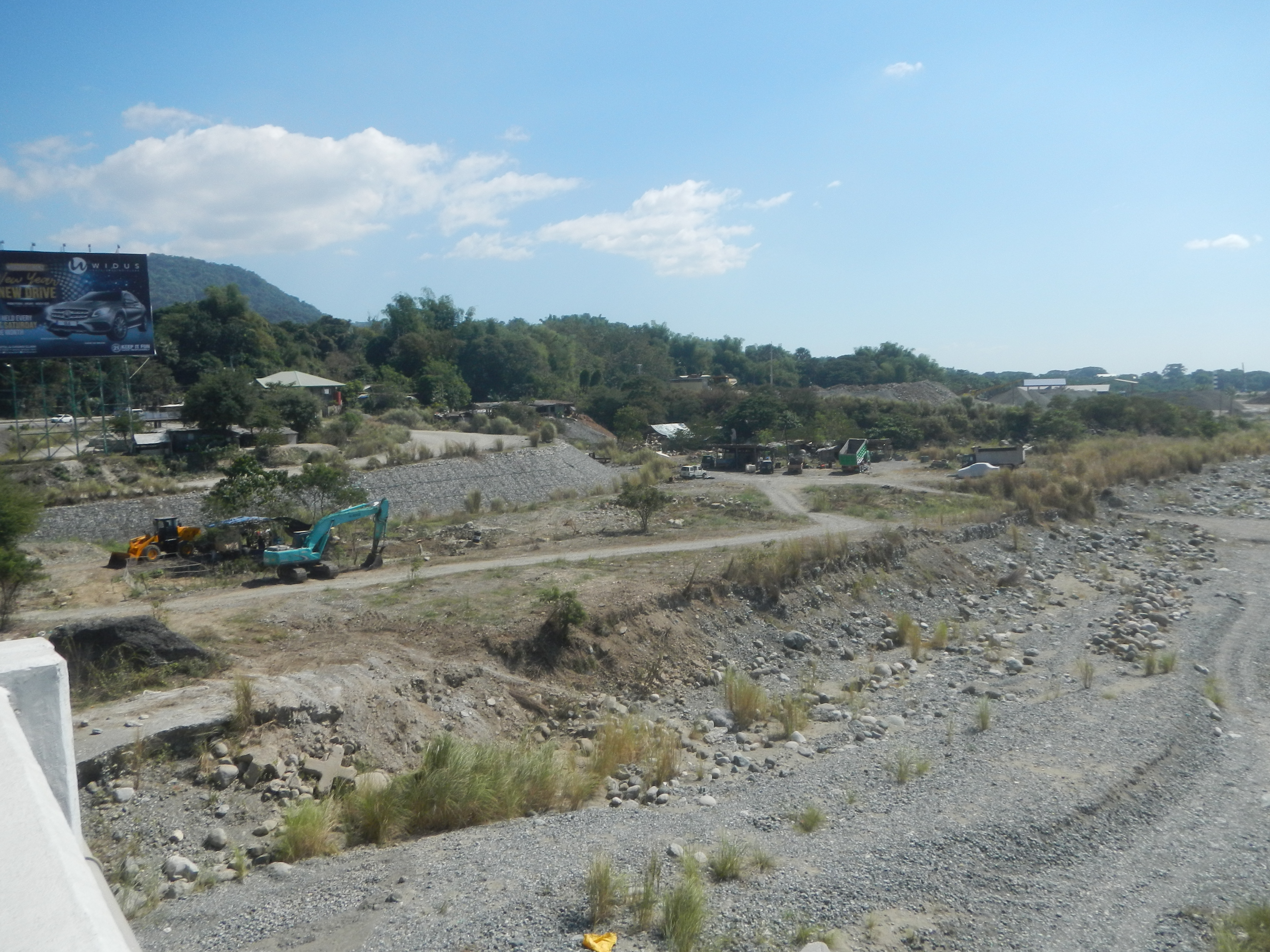
Bued River viewed from Agat (Bued) Bridge in Sison, showing rock aggregate crushing activities within the dry riverbanks

The Bued River is heavily silted, and is occasionally dredged. Siltation has been blamed on the drainage of mine tailings from copper and gold mines in Tuba, Benguet. Landslides along Kennon Road, including quarrying and aggregates crushing plants in riversides also release silt and sand into the river. The Agat Bridge, which serves as the highway boundary between the towns of Sison and Rosario, spans several hundred meters due to the widening of the river. The river overflows especially during strong rains and typhoons. A dike in Sison was constructed to prevent inflow into the other villages. The village of Binday in the town of San Fabian has constantly been eroded by the river since the 1970s.

== Pollution ==
Concerns have also been raised over pollution in the river, which is attributed to fecal matter originating from around 1,000 piggeries concentrated along Kennon Road, as well as a tributary creek near the Lion's Head monument that is used as a dumping ground for mining and quarrying waste.

== Cities and municipalities ==
- Baguio
- Tuba, Benguet
- Pugo, La Union (along the southern part of Barangay Saytan)
- Rosario, La Union (upon reaching Barangay Bangar)
- Sison, Pangasinan
- San Fabian, Pangasinan
- Pozorrubio, Pangasinan
- San Jacinto, Pangasinan
- Mangaldan, Pangasinan (merging point with the Angalacan River)
- Dagupan (location of river mouth bordering the town of San Fabian)
