= North Star Mill =

Quartz mining mill in Grass Valley, California

Coordinates: 39.1944°N 121.0763°W

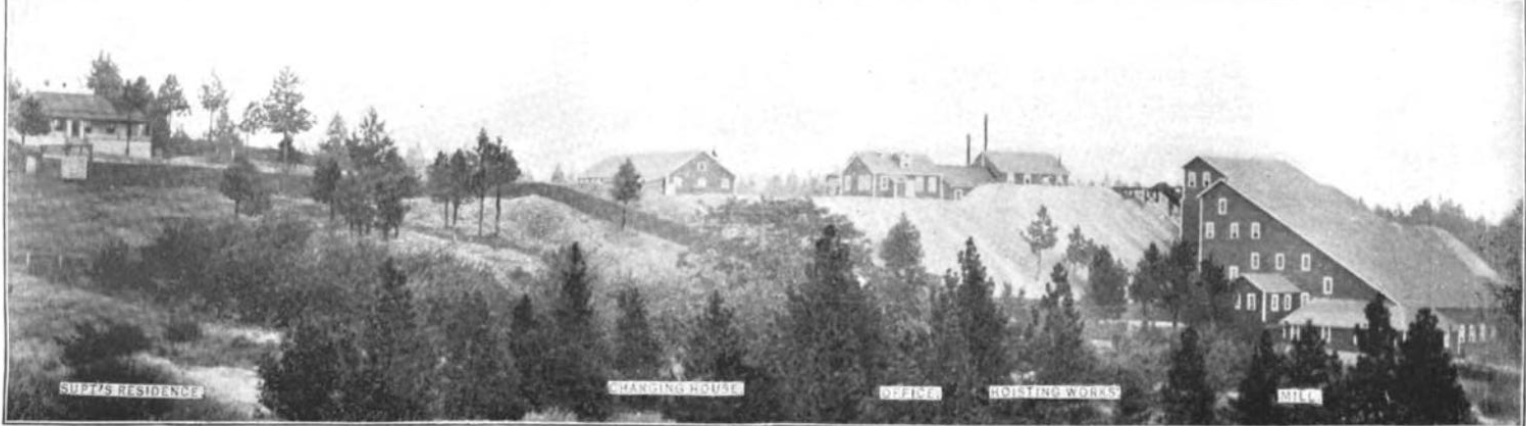
Superintendent's residence, Changing House, Office, Hoisting Works, Mill (l-r)

The North Star Mill was an American water-powered gold mining quartz mill located at the site of the North Star Mine in Grass Valley, California. The North Star Mining Company began construction of the mine's new mill in 1886. It was completed in February 1887, and began operations on March 15, 1887. In 1898, it employed about 150 men.

== Early history ==
Placer mining was begun in Nevada County, California in 1848, with the first quartz ledge located in the summer of 1850.

In 1870, thirteen men were necessary in the 24 stamp North Star Mill, of which but 16 stamps ran regularly.

== Construction ==
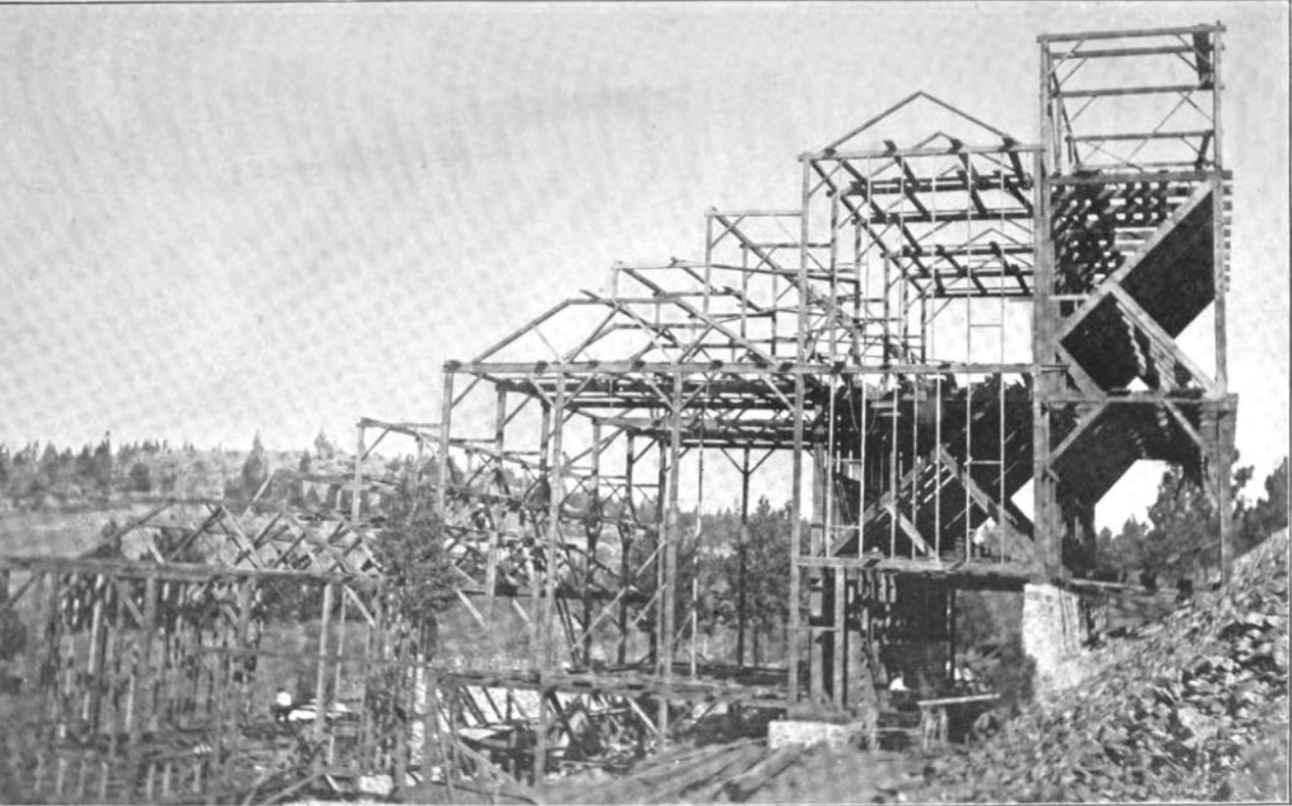
Construction of the mill

During the year 1886, operations at the North Star mine had reached such a stage of development that the necessity of a crushing plant at the mine became imperative. The local topography presented favorable conditions for a new mill site. At a distance of only 142 feet (43 m) from the landing-floor of the main incline of the mine, it was found possible to discharge the ore at a vertical height of 67 feet (20 m) above the projected concentrator floor.

Early in October 1886, the erection of a 30-stamp mill was in progress. During its construction, all mining operations continued uninterruptedly, the ore extracted being crushed in leased plants 1 mile (1.6 km) away. The building, designed with a capacity of 40 stamps, was speedily erected; and within sixty days, the large structure was under cover. Late in February 1887, the mill was in readiness, and, upon the completion of the water-power system, then being introduced at both mine and mill, the crushing of ore was commenced March 15, 1887.

== Operations ==
On passing into the mill, the ore was discharged over grizzlies, placed at the top of long ore-bins. There were eight fine-ore bins, one for each battery, of five stamps, each provided with a grizzly 4 by 12 feet (1.2 m × 3.7 m) in size, set at an angle of 40°. The 3 by 1 inch (76 mm × 25 mm) bars were placed on edge, 2 inches (51 mm) apart. These grizzlies classified the mine ore into fine and coarse. The former dropped through the grizzly directly into the fine-ore bin, from which it passed through a gate, supplying the automatic feeder, which in turn supplied its own particular battery. Meanwhile, the coarse ore was delivered over the grizzly into the coarse-ore bin, from which it passed through a gate into one of the three rock-breakers. From the breakers, it dropped as "fine". into the fine-ore bin, mixing with the mine-fine, and passing on into the ore-feeders.

The ore thus passed, by gravity alone, from the dumping-floor to the automatic feeders. One man on the day-shift operated the rock-breakers to crush the accumulated coarse ore delivered from the mine. The breakers ran intermittently, aggregating not over 7 hours' work during the 24.

From the automatic feeders, the quartz was delivered into the batteries for stamping and amalgamation. The free-milling character of the material demanded only the simplest methods of amalgamation and concentration for the recovery of its gold-contents. The pulp discharged through the battery-screens flowed over silver-plated copper amalgamating-plates to concentrating-machines beyond, passing then for further treatment in pans, or escaping from the mill direct as tailings.

The mill contained 40 stamps, weighing, when newly shod, 875 pounds (397 kg) each. The stamps dropped 7 inches (180 mm) 86 times per minute. The shoes (steel exclusively used), weighed 159 pounds (72 kg), and the remaining 716 pounds (325 kg) of the stamp were distributed as follows: stem, 358 pounds (162 kg); stamp-head, 228 pounds (103 kg); tappets, 130 pounds (59 kg). The life of a steel shoe averaged 130 days, and it crushed during that period 260 short tons (240 t) of ore. The weight of the die when new was 100 pounds (45 kg), and it lost during a life of 70 days one-half its original weight. The introduction of cast iron plates 2 inches (51 mm) thick increased the life of the die to 80 days, the die, when removed, weighing from 40–45 pounds (18–20 kg). These plates, two in number to each battery, fit snugly in the mortar, forming a false bottom, upon which the dies were bedded. They served a double purpose, prolonging the life of the dies and decreasing the height of the discharge, which ranged from an initial of 4 inches (100 mm) to a maximum of 6 inches (150 mm). At the North Star mill, in crushing 113,955 short tons (103,378 t) of ore, the cost for screens was US$0.008 per ton. Dies cost US$0.026 and shoes US$0.056 per ton.

The recovery of gold was first made in the mortar, where the amalgamation began. Mercury was fed to the batteries at regular intervals, the amount varying with the grade of the ore crushed. at times, this amount exceeded 1 pound (0.45 kg) per battery, or a flask of 76.5 pounds (34.7 kg) in nine days. Of this amount, 35 percent was recovered at the fortnightly resorting of amalgam. There was a considerable loss of mercury.

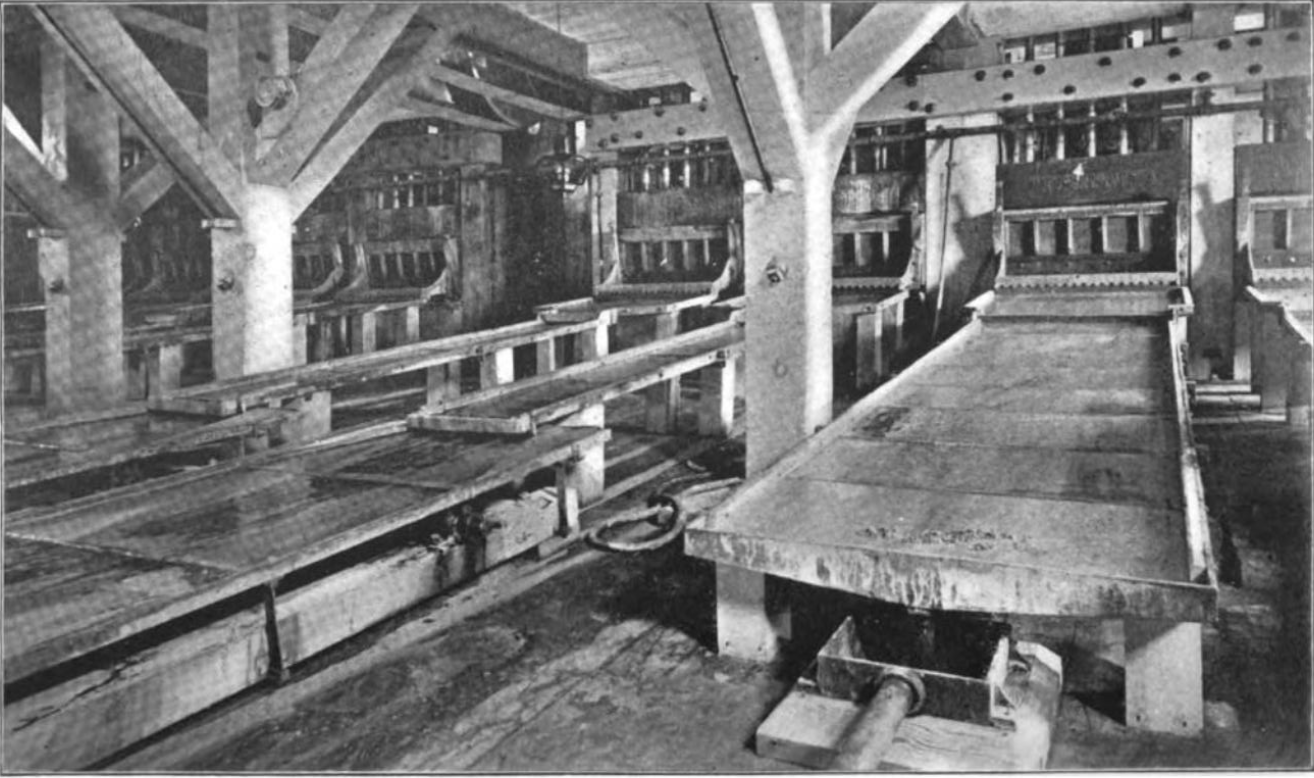
Apron plates

In the interior of the mortar, immediately under the screen-frame, are silver-plated copper plates 4 by 52 inches (100 mm × 1,320 mm). These plates, one for each mortar, were bolted to chuck-blocks fitting tightly against the lip of the mortar. As the pulp is discharged from the mortar through screens, it fell upon an outside battery- or splash-plate 18 inches (460 mm) in width, covering the iron mortar apron, which was bolted to the mortar and forms part of it. The length of this plate was equal to that of the inside plate.

The apron-plate, 4 by 58 inches (100 mm × 1,470 mm), lies below the splash-plate, tapering to 24 inches (610 mm) and connecting with the three sluice-plates which cover the sluice 12 by 2 feet (3.66 m × 0.61 m). From the sluice, the pulp passes over shaking-tables, which have a plated surface of 10 by 4 feet (3.0 m × 1.2 m), made up of two plates 4 by 3 feet (1.22 m × 0.91 m) and two smaller ones, each 4 by 2 feet (1.22 m × 0.61 m).

The grades of the plates were as follows: battery- and apron-plates, 1.5 inches (38 mm) to the foot; sluice-plates, 14 inches (360 mm) to the foot; shaking-tables, 16 inches (410 mm) to the foot. The natural tendency of the narrow sluice-plates to "scour" has always been objectionable, and in fitting the more recently erected batteries with a line of plates, the width of the sluice has been doubled. These plates, eight in number, are placed side by side, and overlap slightly, aggregating 15 by 4 feet (4.6 m × 1.2 m) wide, the total actual plate-surface being equal to that of the narrow sluice-plates and shaking-table plates combined. The grade of these new plates is approximately uniform at 1.5 inches (38 mm) to the foot.

Two-thirds of all the gold recovered by amalgamation was found in the batteries. The yield was variable, frequently reaching 75 per cent. Of the amount recovered from the outside plates, the battery- and apron-plates produced 70 per cent, the sluice-plates 23 per cent, and the shaking-tables 7 per cent. The average value of amalgam from all sources was about US$7.25 per ounce; the fineness of the gold-bars was 856. The batteries were cleaned up fortnightly; the outside plates, every other day, frequently daily, and, on rare occasions, morning and evening. In addition to the usual method of recovering the amalgam from the plates, a method of hot-water "sweating" was introduced.

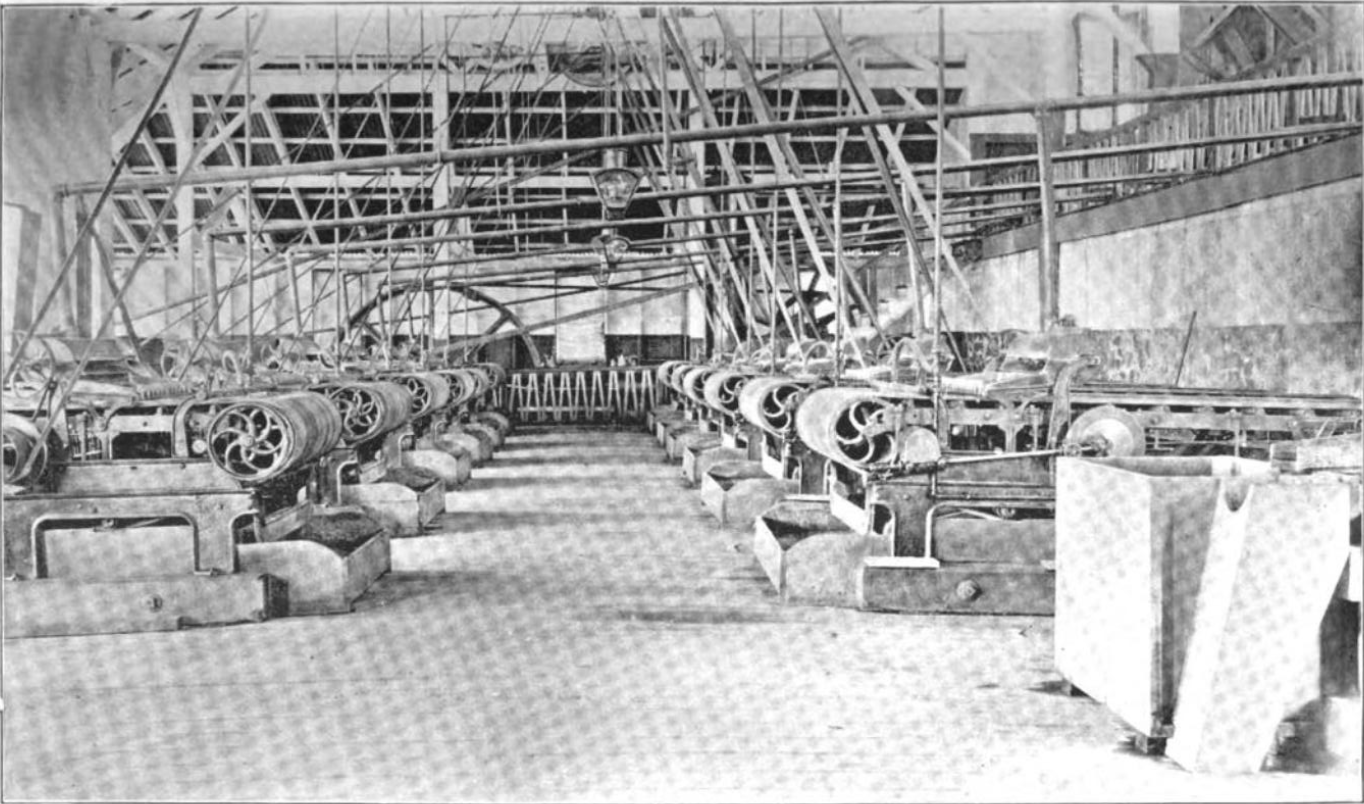
Concentrator-floor

Leaving the battery floor, The pulp was conveyed through 3 inches (76 mm) pipes to the concentrators on the floor below. Each battery of 5 stamps was provided with two machines, the full complement consisting of 12 Triumph and 4 Frue vanners. The latter machines were preferred, and were introduced when 10 additional stamps were installed. The machines were arranged on one floor and overlooked by one man on each shift.

The ore crushed at the North Star mill contained about 4 per cent of "sulphurets." Their average value was US$53.58 per ton; and they yielded in seven years a total product of US$236,756. The concentrates were sold to the local chlorination-works.

From the concentrating-machines the pulp escaped as tailings, containing more or less gold, notwithstanding a high percentage saved of the ore-value (reaching 94 per cent under favorable conditions). In 1894, there was in operation a simplex rotary amalgamator, treating 10 short tons (9.1 t) of tailings per 24 hours. Results obtained at the time reduced the loss in the tailings US$0.22 per ton.

The mill was operated entirely by water-power and notwithstanding a high rate per available horse-power, the cost of power per ton of ore crushed did not exceeded US$0.32. The water used was previously utilized by the Original Empire Mill and Mining Company under a head of 450 feet (140 m). At the North Star, the effective head was 275 feet (84 m) at the mill.

== Gallery ==
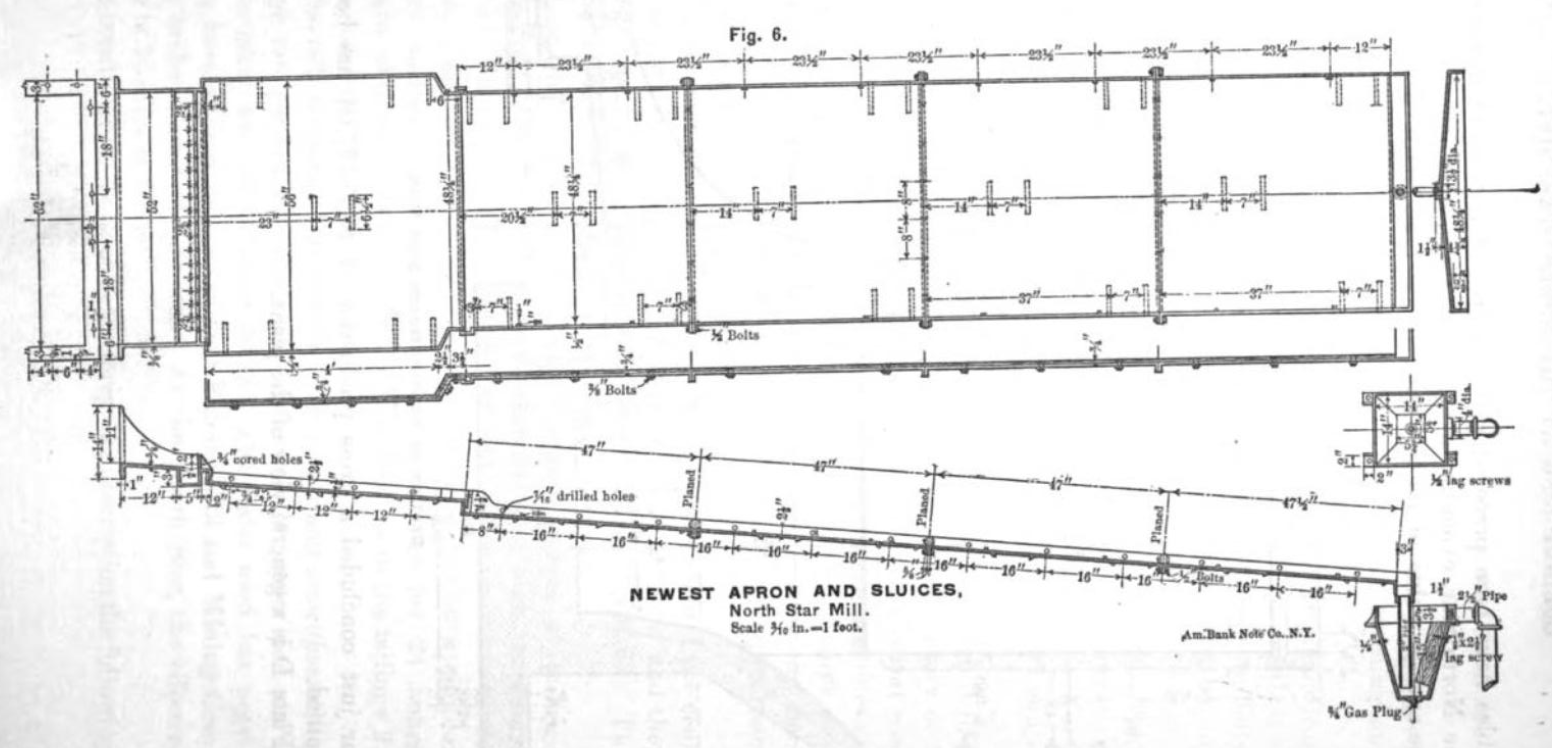
Apron and sluices

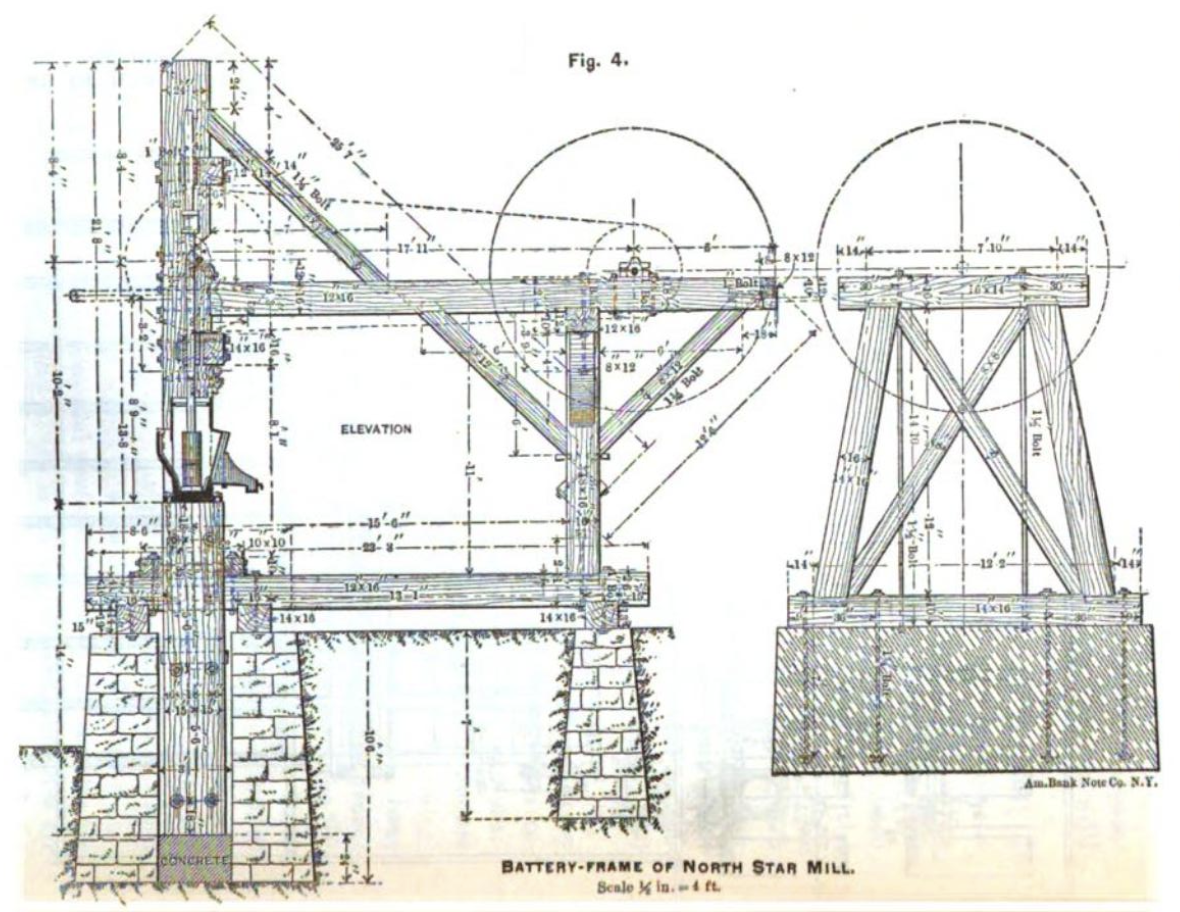
Battery-frame

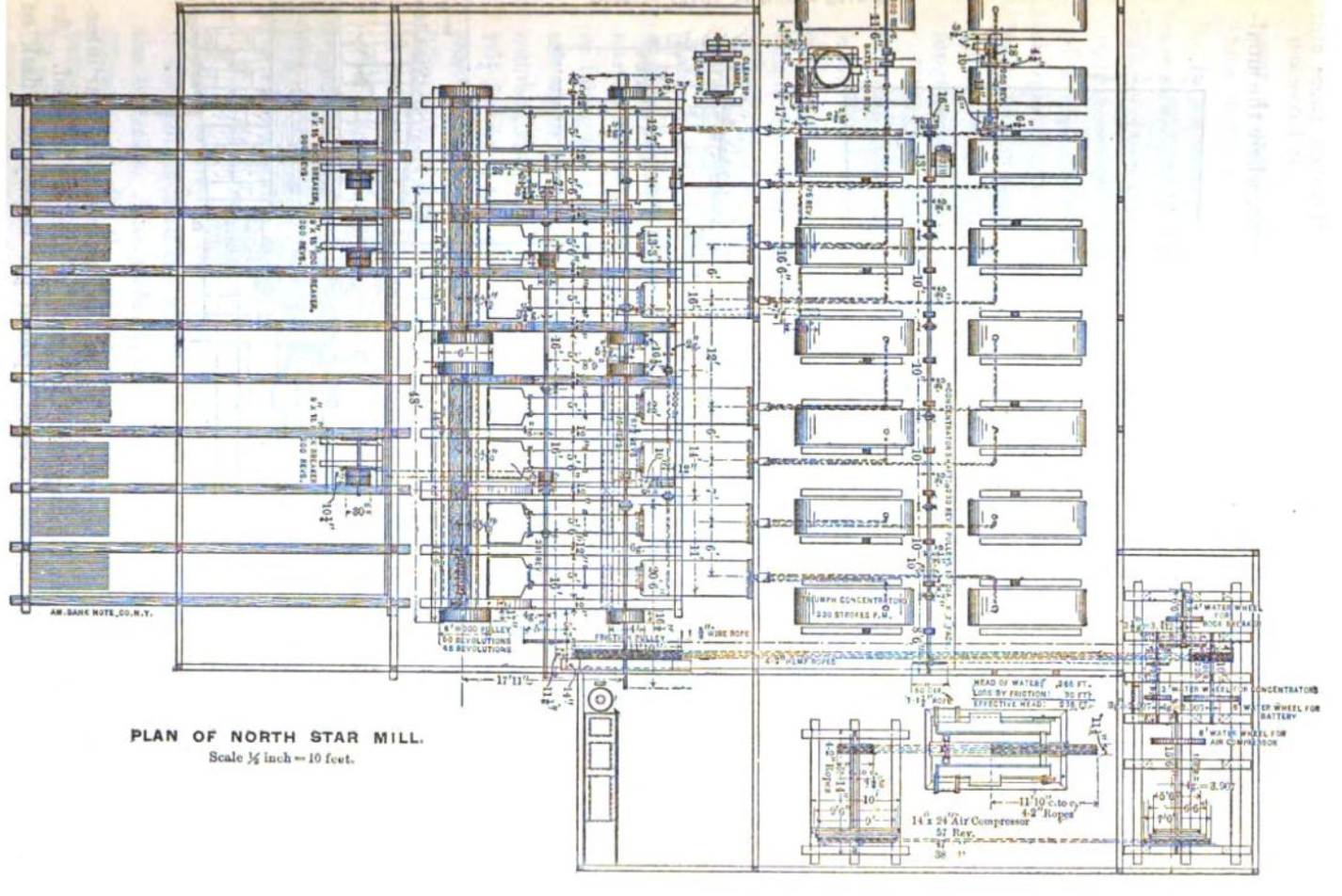
Plan

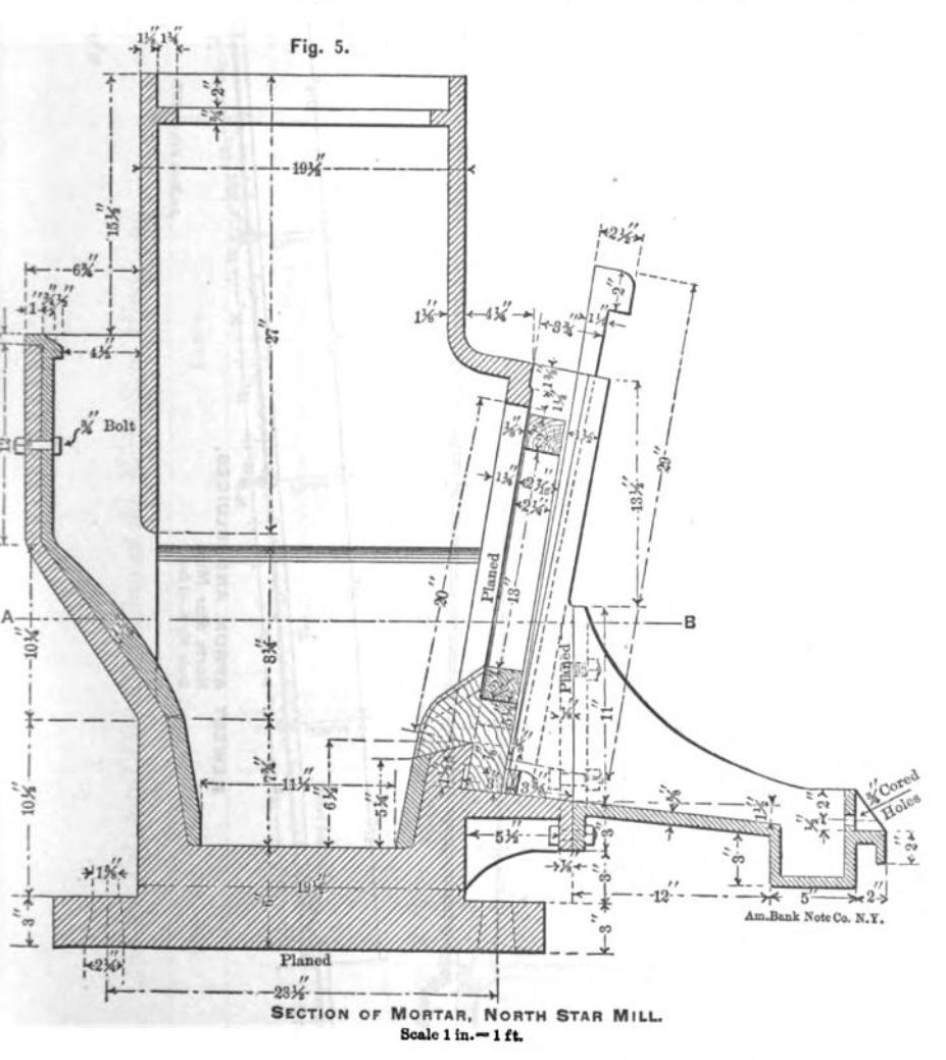
Section of mortar

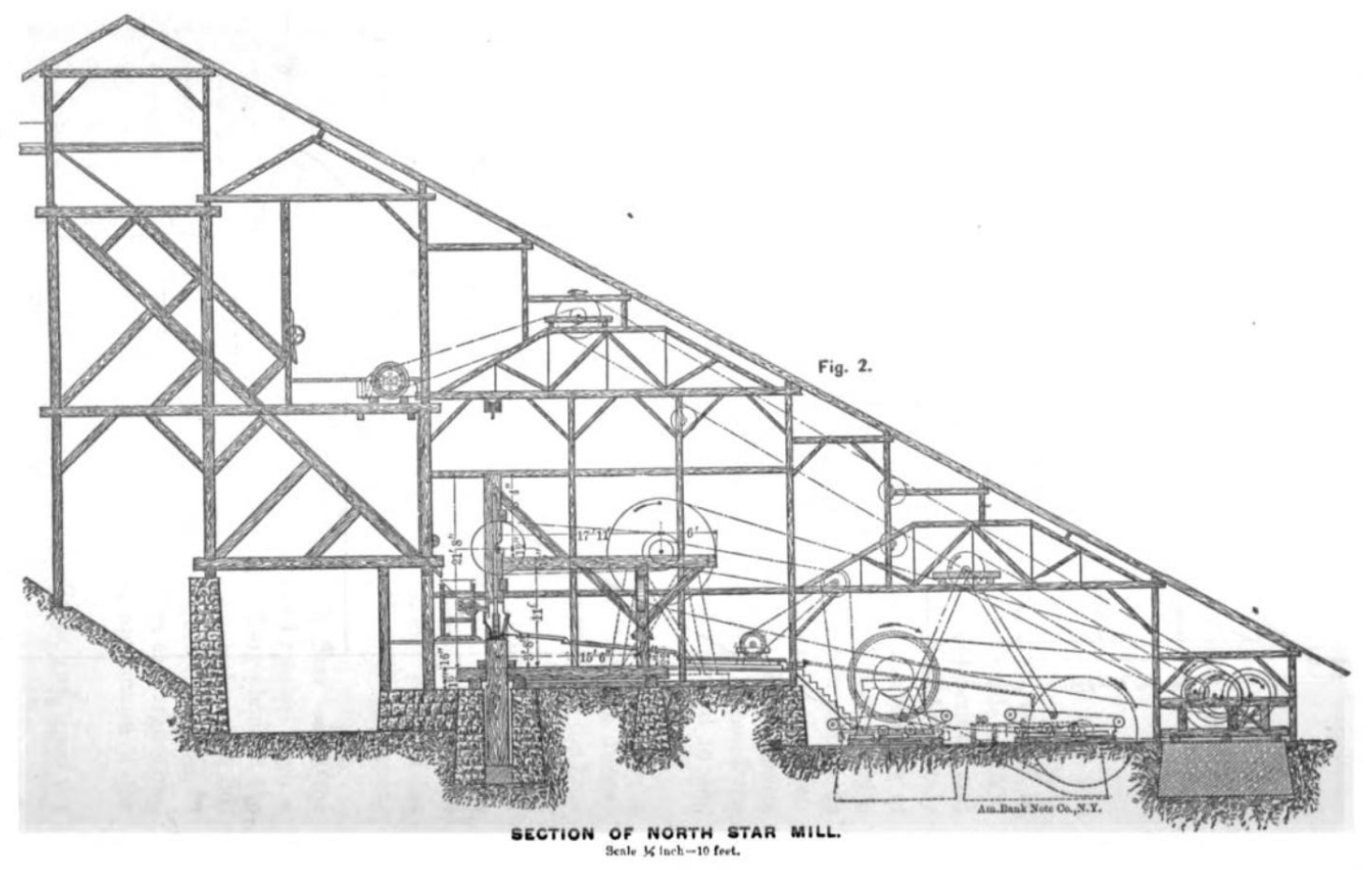
Section

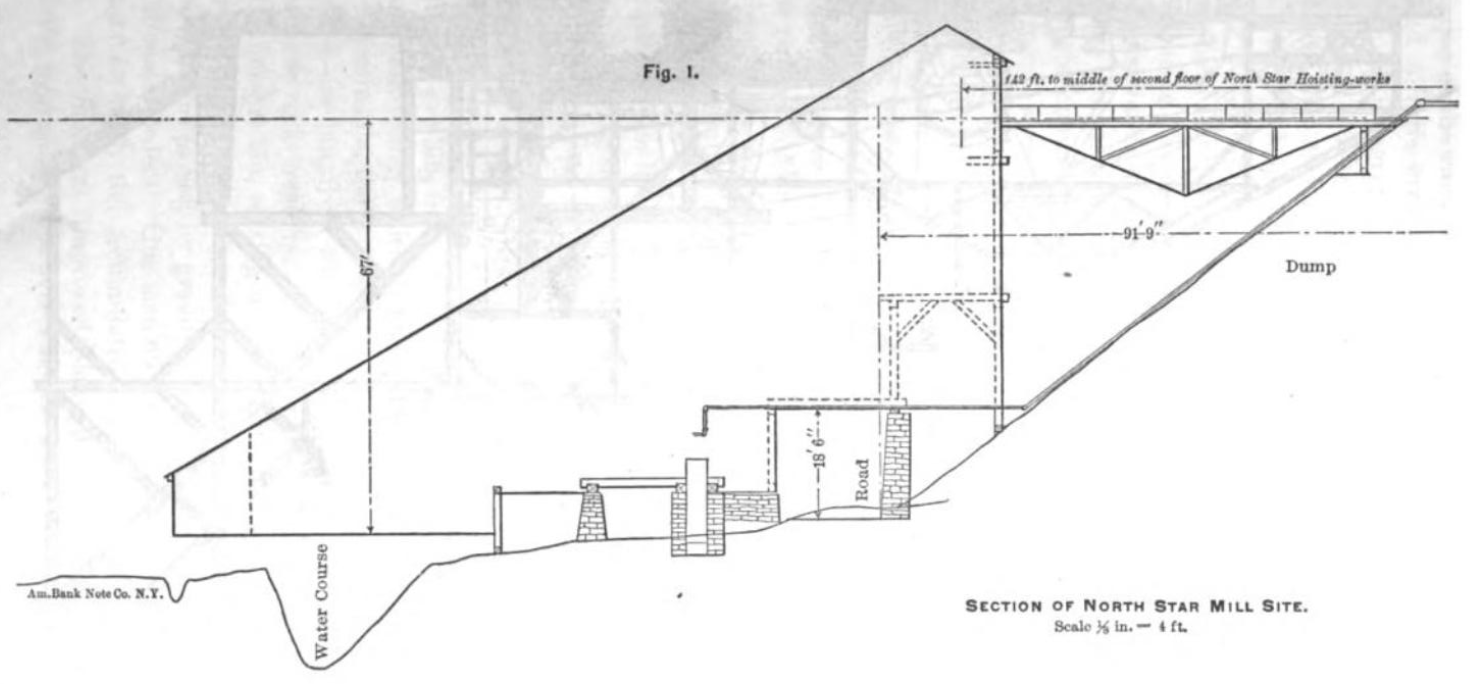
Site section
