= Perfecto V. Fernandez =

Perfecto V. Fernandez, popularly known as Pecto, or Atty. Fernandez is a Filipino lawyer, professor and writer.

Perfecto V. Fernandez was born on May 31, 1931, in San Fabian, Pangasinan, and obtained his law degree in 1957. Thereafter he took the bar, and was placed 10th in the 1958 bar exams. He was married to the former Albina Peczon in 1959.

He was a law professor, a writer of law books, bar reviewer and lecturer and political commentator in the Philippines. Fernandez was an authority on constitutional law and labor law, being part of the Philippine jurisprudence project (UP Law Center) and wrote a number of papers on labor law, constitutional law and libel law. He was the former chief legal counsel of the University of the Philippines, a bar reviewer in UST, UE, FEU and UM.

== Media ==
He appeared in the defunct television series Velez This Week with the late Jose Mari Velez and Debate with Oscar Orbos and Solita Monsod as well as a show emceed by Professor Randy David.

He wrote for the Philippine Collegian when he was still studying in UP and contributed to a number of publications such as the Graphic, Panorama and dailies.

== Legacy ==
Fernandez died in 2000. He is survived by his wife, Albina Peczon Fernandez, and his children, three of whom are lawyers. His children are Jose (UP LLB, 1985), † Cristobal (UP LLB, 1987), Claro (UP BA Comm, 1985), † Samuel (UPIS 1980) and Gabriela (UP LLB, 1998)

Dean Pacifico Agabin said of him "Prof. Fernandez is not only a deep thinker but he was also a great teacher and a true scholar. And when the history of the College of Law is written a hundred years from now, his will be an august and imperial name in legal history. His studies on custom law, his essays in jurisprudence, and his lectures in constitutional law will be taken as benchmarks in our legal literature" (Law Monitor: July 2000). Said one of his colleagues: "It was Pepe Fernandez who designed the financial facility that has sustained the UP Law Center throughout its existence. He embodied this in a legislative proposal that was to become the Charter of the UP Law Center."

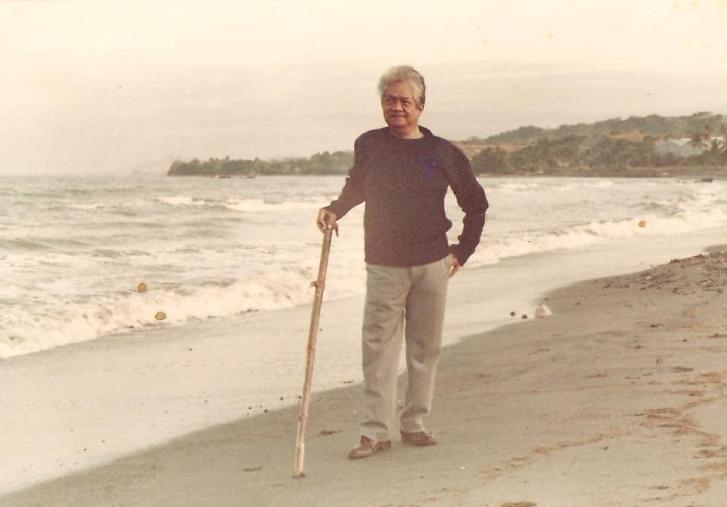

== Books and awards ==
Fernandez received many awards as UP Law alumni with professorial chair on jurisprudence, he is listed as a United Nations expert and is the author of law books.

- Criminal Procedure, Evidence and Law (1981)
- Welfare and Social Legislation (1976)
- Labor Standards and Welfare Legislation (with Camilo Quiason)
