= Sison, Pangasinan =

Municipality in Pangasinan, Philippines

Sison
- Municipality
- Municipality of Sison
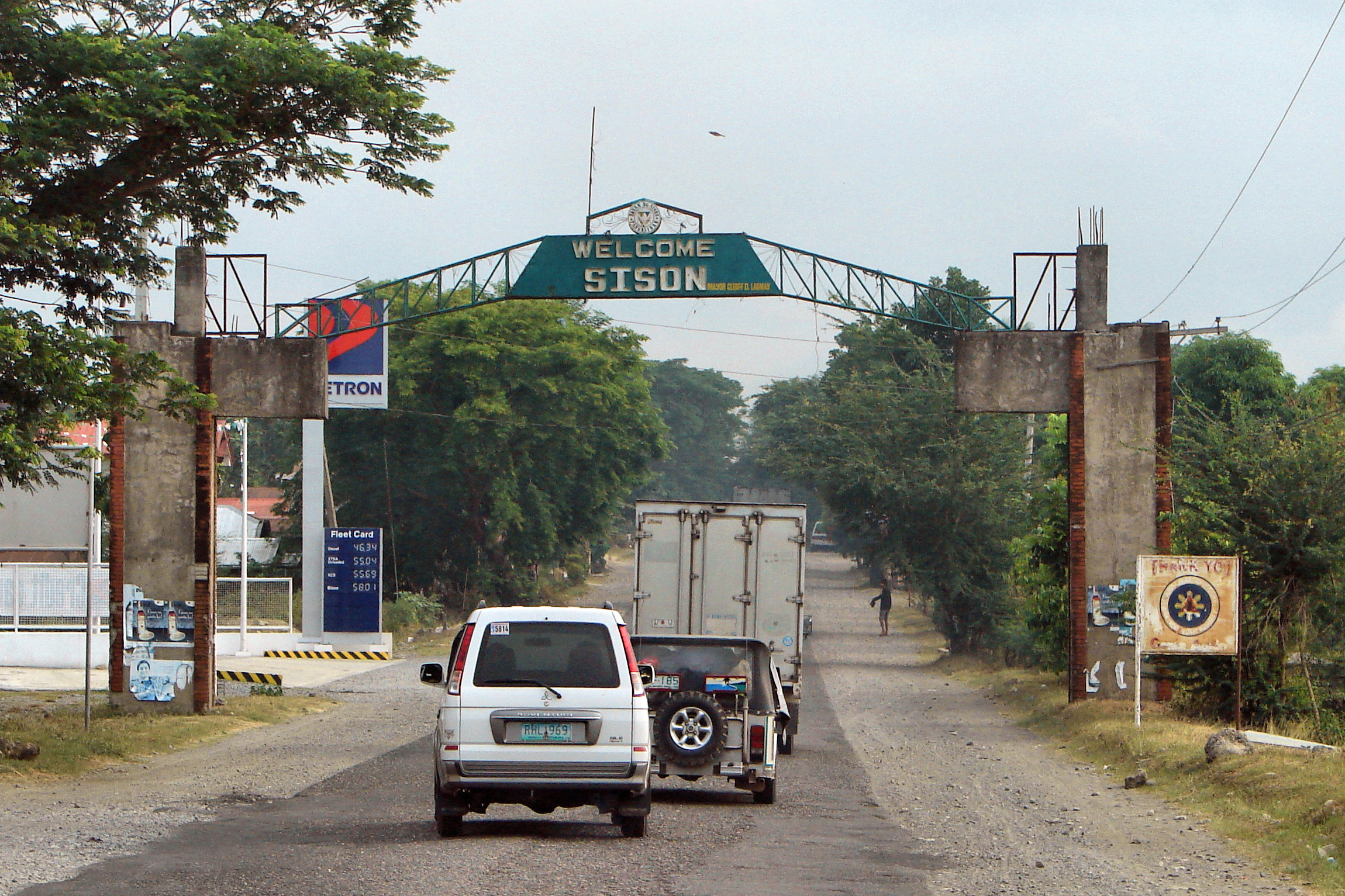
- Arch of welcome

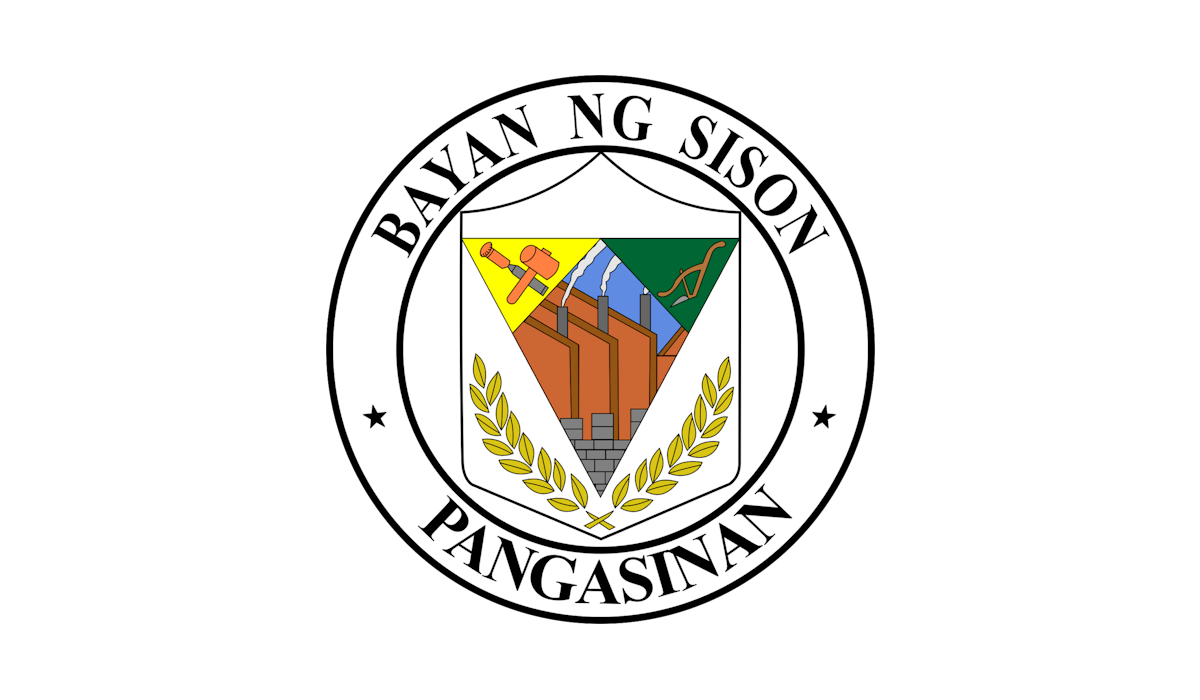
- Flag Seal

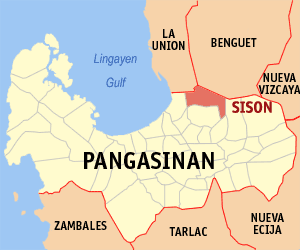
- Map of Pangasinan with Sison highlighted
- Interactive map of Sison
- Location within the Philippines
- Coordinates: 16°10′N 120°31′E
- Country: Philippines
- Region: Ilocos Region
- Province: Pangasinan
- District: 5th district
- Founded: December 14, 1862
- Annexation to San Fabian: October 8, 1903
- Chartered: October 31, 1906
- Named for: Perfecto Sison
- Barangays: 28 (see Barangays)

Government
  - Type: Sangguniang Bayan
  - Mayor: Alma M. Lomibao
  - Vice Mayor: Moises P. Alamay, Jr.
  - Representative: Ramon N. Guico, Jr.
  - Municipal Council: Members: Nora Q. Ventura; Ericson S. Biason; Jomar R. Fabros; Jimmar O. Manuyag; Mina Joy C. Pangasinan; Larry Leo C. Benosa; Ginalyn A. Oyaman; Samson P. Murao
  - Electorate: 33,363 voters (2025)

Area
  - Total: 81.88 km^{2} (31.61 sq mi)
- Elevation: 131 m (430 ft)

Population (2024 census)
  - Total: 51,439
  - Density: 628.2/km^{2} (1,627/sq mi)
  - Households: 12,948

Economy
  - Income class: 1st municipal income class
  - Poverty incidence: 10.03% (2015)
  - Revenue: ₱ 289.4 million (2024)
  - Assets: ₱ 1,171 million (2024)
  - Expenditure: ₱ 232.3 million (2024)
  - Liabilities: ₱ 221.1 million (2024)

Service provider
  - Electricity: Pangasinan 3 Electric Cooperative (PANELCO 3)
- Time zone: UTC+8 (PST)
- ZIP code: 2434
- PSGC: 0105541000
- IDD : area code: +63 (0)75
- Native languages: Pangasinan; Ilocano; Tagalog
- Website: www.sisonlgu.gov.ph

Sison, officially the Municipality of Sison (Tagalog: [ˈsisɔn]; Pangasinan: Baley na Sison; Ilocano: Ili ti Sison; Tagalog: Bayan ng Sison), is a municipality in the province of Pangasinan, Philippines. According to the 2024 census, it has a population of 51,439 people.

== Etymology ==
The town's original name was Alava, and was renamed after Don Perfecto Sison, the first governor of Pangasinan.

== History ==
Sison was once part of San Fabian until petitioners from Barrio Bolaoen signed a manifesto on June 30, 1858, expressing their intention of creating a separate pueblo. It was petitioned to the gobernadorcillo of San Fabian and was later endorsed to the Alcalde Mayor of Lingayen on August 8, 1858.

After the definition of the jurisdiction of the proposed new pueblo, the administrative proceedings began with the mayor of San Fabian himself, Don Enrique Casaoay, as among those who appeared on behalf of the petitioners. On December 15, 1862, a royal decree was finally issued declaring the creation of a pueblo independent of San Fabian's civil jurisdiction. The pueblo was called Alava. Don Faustino Baclit served as its ad interim head until the pueblo's first elected president, Don Felix Genelazo, assumed his office on March 1, 1868.

On October 8, 1903, Alava was absorbed by the municipality of San Fabian by virtue of Philippine Commission Act No. 931. It was later separated as a re-established municipality on October 31, 1906.

In 1907, Esperanza - north-east of Alava - was formed into Pinmilapil, Agat, Sagunto, Cauringan, Bila and Colisao (now in San Fabian). Labayug was formed also into Inmalog, Calunetan, San Andres, Alibeng, Bacayao and Killo. Esperanza and Labayug were joined as Artacho, its poblacion, which become a regular municipality.

On March 25, 1918, Governor General Francis Burton Harrison signed Executive Order No. 12, s. 1918 consolidating the township of Artacho and the municipality of Alava as the Municipality of Sison. Following this incorporation, Alava was renamed Sison in honor of Don Perfecto Sison, first provincial governor of Pangasinan.

== Geography ==
Sison is geographically located on the northern portion of Pangasinan, bordering the provincial boundaries of La Union and Benguet. It has a total land area of 81.88 square kilometers (31.61 sq mi). It is bounded on the north by Rosario (La Union), Tuba (Benguet); on the south by Pozorrubio; on the southeast by San Manuel and Binalonan; on the west by San Fabian.

Sison is situated 44.37 kilometers (27.57 mi) from the provincial capital Lingayen, and 208.36 kilometers (129.47 mi) from the country's capital city of Manila.

=== Barangays ===
Sison is politically subdivided into 28 barangays. Each barangay consists of puroks and some have sitios.

- Agat
- Alibeng
- Amagbagan
- Artacho
- Asan Norte
- Asan Sur
- Bantay Insik
- Bila
- Binmeckeg
- Bulaoen East
- Bulaoen West
- Cabaritan
- Calunetan
- Camangaan
- Cauringan
- Dungon
- Esperanza
- Inmalog
- Killo
- Labayug
- Paldit
- Pindangan
- Pinmilapil
- Poblacion Central
- Poblacion Norte
- Poblacion Sur
- Sagunto
- Tara-tara

=== Climate ===
Climate data for Sison, Pangasinan
Month	Jan	Feb	Mar	Apr	May	Jun	Jul	Aug	Sep	Oct	Nov	Dec	Year
Mean daily maximum °C (°F)	31 (88)	31 (88)	32 (90)	34 (93)	35 (95)	34 (93)	32 (90)	32 (90)	32 (90)	32 (90)	32 (90)	31 (88)	32 (90)
Mean daily minimum °C (°F)	22 (72)	22 (72)	22 (72)	24 (75)	24 (75)	24 (75)	24 (75)	24 (75)	24 (75)	23 (73)	23 (73)	22 (72)	23 (74)
Average precipitation mm (inches)	13.6 (0.54)	10.4 (0.41)	18.2 (0.72)	15.7 (0.62)	178.4 (7.02)	227.9 (8.97)	368 (14.5)	306.6 (12.07)	310.6 (12.23)	215.7 (8.49)	70.3 (2.77)	31.1 (1.22)	1,766.5 (69.56)
Average rainy days	3	2	2	4	14	16	23	21	24	15	10	6	140
Source: World Weather Online (modeled/calculated data, not measured locally)

== Demographics ==
Population Census of Sison

Year	Pop.	±% p.a.
1903	2,902	—
1918	8,829	+7.70%
1939	13,168	+1.92%
1948	13,480	+0.26%
1960	16,298	+1.59%
1970	20,849	+2.49%
1975	23,642	+2.55%
1980	25,053	+1.17%

Year	Pop.	±% p.a.
1990	32,892	+2.76%
1995	35,625	+1.51%
2000	40,955	+3.03%
2007	42,791	+0.61%
2010	43,979	+1.00%
2015	47,518	+1.48%
2020	52,320	+2.05%
2024	51,439	−0.41%

Source: Philippine Statistics Authority

=== Language ===
Pangasinan is the dominant language of Sison. Ilocano is also spoken and widely understood by the residents.

=== Religion ===
==== The Parish of Nuestra Señora del Carmel de Álava ====
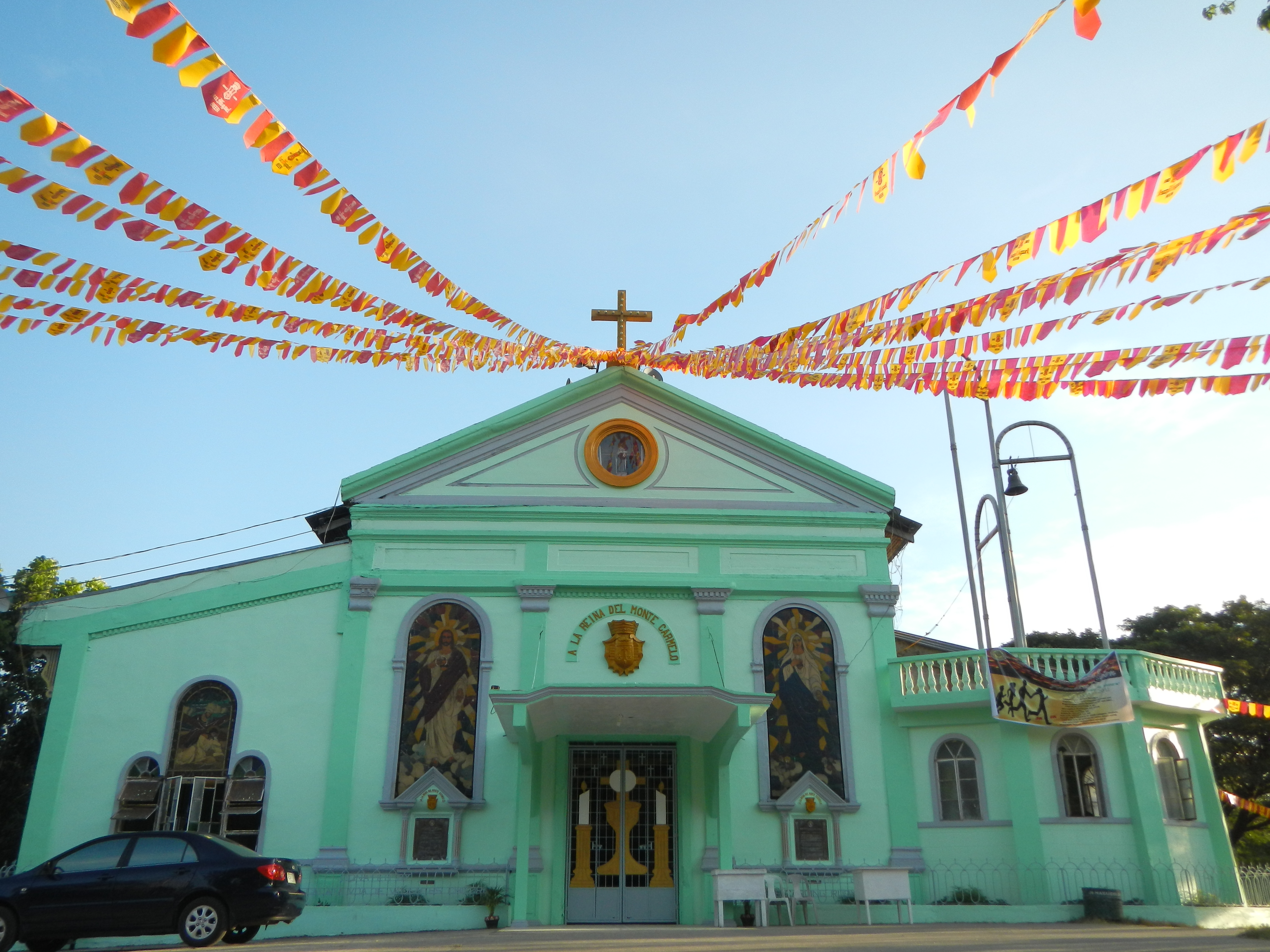
Shrine of Our Lady of Mount Carmel

The Parish of Nuestra Señora del Carmel de Álava (Sison, 2434 Pangasinan) was canonically erected in 1896–1898. It is under the jurisdiction of the Roman Catholic Diocese of Urdaneta (from the Roman Catholic Archdiocese of Lingayen-Dagupan, Archdioecesis Lingayensis-Dagupanensis, created on May 19, 1928, elevated to Archdiocese on February 16, 1963, comprising the capital of the province, 2 cities and 15 municipalities in the central part of Pangasinan; Suffragans: Alaminos, Cabanatuan, San Fernando, La Union, San Jose, Nueva Ecija and Urdaneta; Titular: St. John the Apostle and Evangelist).

The November 20, 1896 Spanish Royal Decree created Alava as a Parish of Diocese of Nueva Segovia. In 1918 the town was renamed to Sison honoring Senator Pedro Ma. Sison.

In 1928 the Parish Church was included into the Diocese of Lingayen-Pangasinan. In the 15th Centenary Anniversary of the Council of Ephesus, the Sison Parish was consecrated under “La Reina Del Monte Carmelo” (Our Lady of Mount Carmel), forming part of the Roman Catholic Diocese of Urdaneta in 1985. But it was only on its Centennial founding on November 20, 1996, that the Parish Church became a Diocesan Shrine. Its feast day is every 16 July. The Parish Priest is Rev. Fr. Noel B. Bulosan.

On July 16, 2024, the venerated Marian image of Our Lady of Mount Carmel received an episcopal coronation by Jacinto Agcaoili Jose, Bishop of Urdaneta, and was declared as the Queen and Patroness of Sison, Pangasinan.

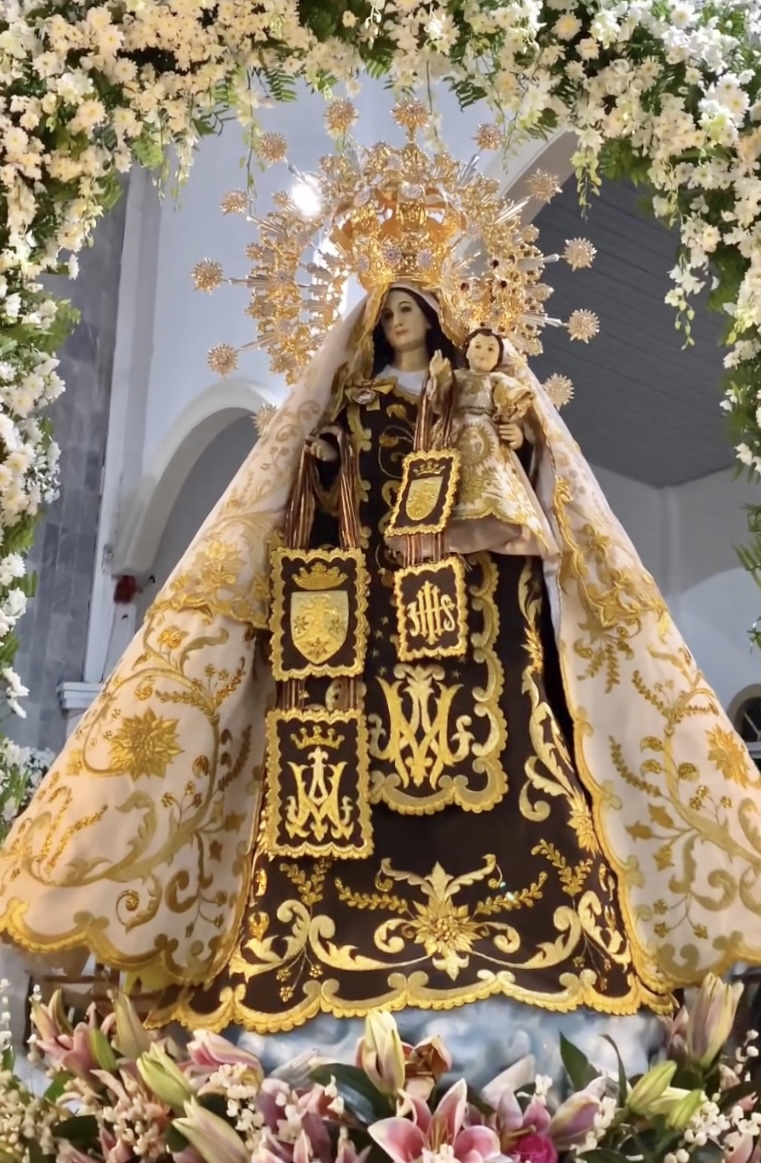
Statue of Our Lady of Mount Carmel, as it is crowned in 2024

== Economy ==
Poverty incidence of Sison (%)

Source: Philippine Statistics Authority

== Government ==
=== Local government ===
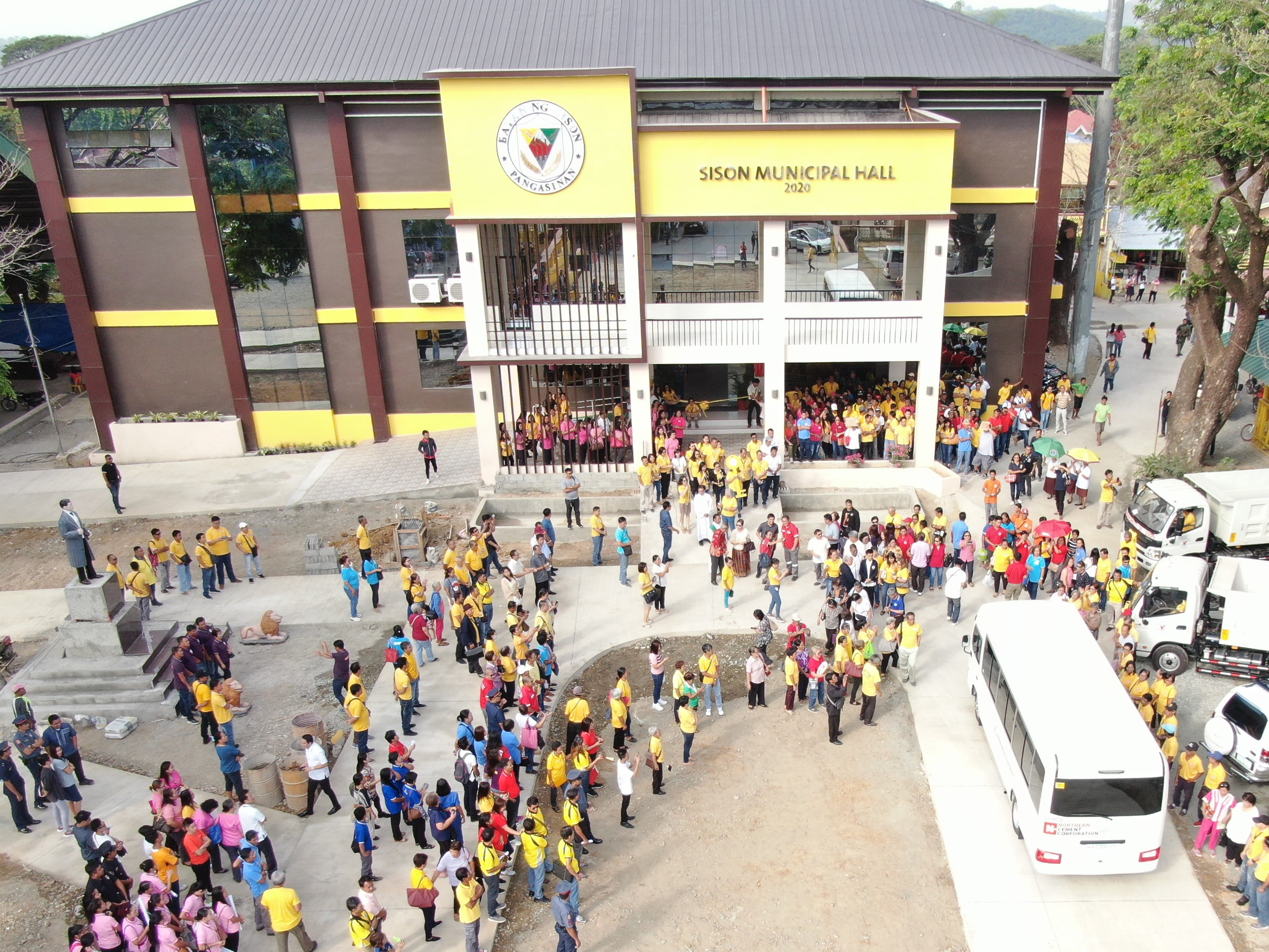
New Sison Municipal Hall. Dedicated February 17, 2020

Just as the national government, the municipal government of Sison is divided into three branches: executive, legislative and judiciary. The judicial branch is administered solely by the Supreme Court of the Philippines. The LGUs have control of the executive and legislative branch.

The executive branch is composed of the mayor and the barangay captain for the barangays. The legislative branch is composed of the Sangguniang Bayan (town assembly), and Sangguniang Barangay (barangay council).

The seat of Government is vested upon the Mayor and other elected officers who hold office at the Sison Town hall. The Sanguniang Bayan is the center of legislation, stationed in Sison Legislative Building or Town hall.

=== Elected officials ===
Specifically, Sison's mayor and Chief Executive is Alma "Cares" Lomibao. The sangguniang bayan, the legislative body of the municipality is composed of the municipal vice mayor as the presiding officer, 8 Sanguniang Bayan Members, Indigenous People representative, ABC President, and Sangunian Kabataan (SK) Federation President. (Section 440, Local Government Code of 1991)

Members of the Municipal Council (2025–2028)
Position	Name
Congressman	Ramon N. Guico Jr.
Mayor	Alma M. Lomibao
Vice-Mayor	Moises "Jerry" P. Alamay, Jr.
Councilors	Nora Q. Ventura
Councilors	Ericson S. Biason
Councilors	Jomar R. Fabros
Councilors	Jimmar O. Manuyag
Councilors	Mina Joy C. Pangasinan
Councilors	Larry Leo C. Benosa
Councilors	Ginalyn A. Oyaman
Councilors	Samson P. Murao
Indigenous People Mandatory Representative (IPMR) President	Dionisia D. Sidogen
ABC President	Sonny P. Lacsinto
SK Federation President	Sofia Anne A. Allegores

== Tourism ==
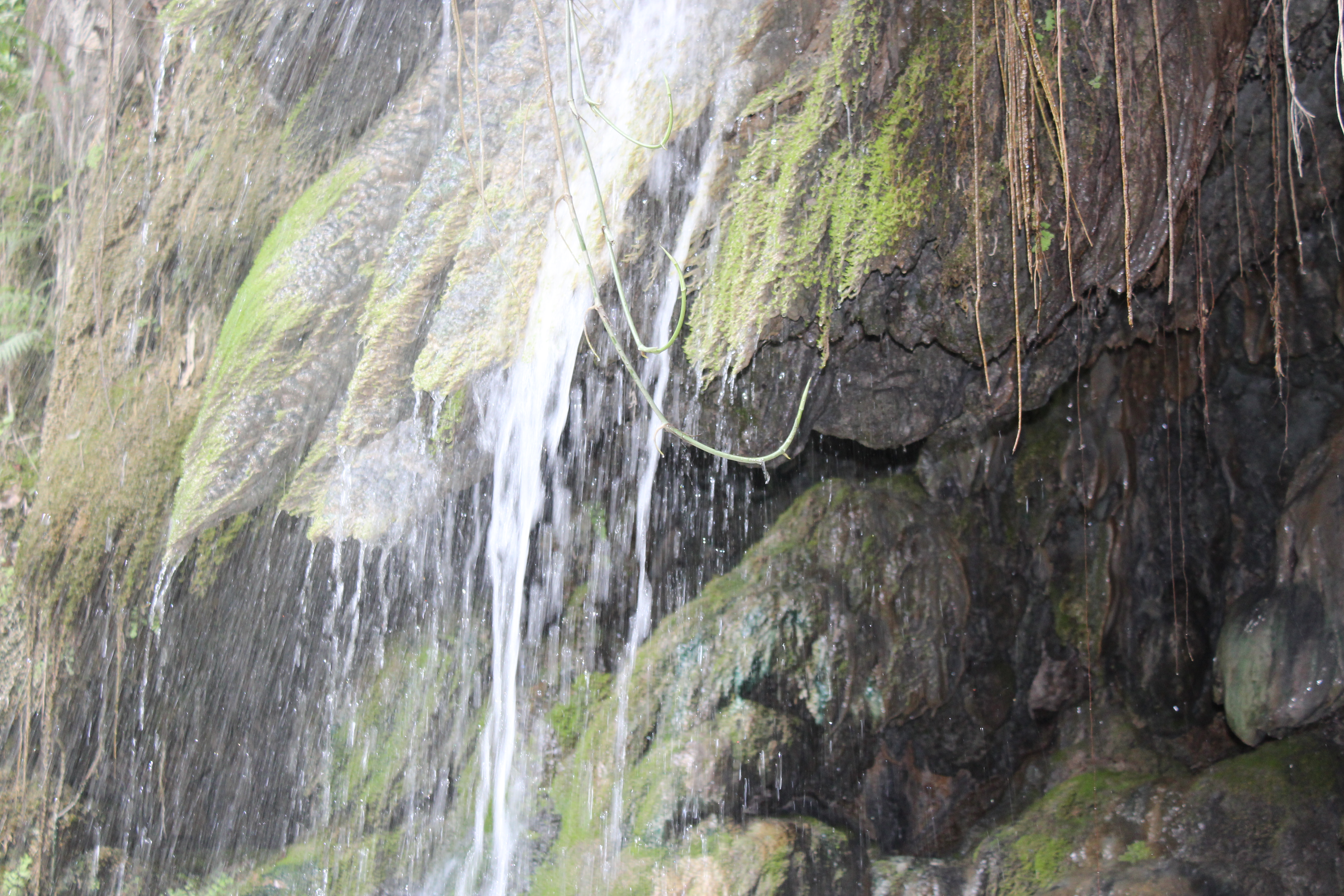
Antong Falls, Sison, Pangasinan

Sison has the following landmark attractions and events:

- Begnas: Sison celebrates the October Begnas festival at the New Public Market yearly with foreign residents participation (Sagada word, "thanksgiving"). National Cultural Minorities under the National Commission on Indigenous Peoples' October joined the yearly event with outsiders from Baguio, Laoac, Pozorrubio, Bago, Kankanaeys, Ibalois and the Aplays.
- 34th Eastern Pangasinan BSP Mini Jamboree
- Antong Falls
- Bued Toll Bridge (Pangasinan-La Union boundary) Gloria Macapagal Arroyo (unveiled on June 21, 2010) the newly reconstructed three-span superstructure Bued Bridge marker in Sison, Pangasinan (destroyed by the October 2010 typhoon Pepeng) the restoration of the three-span superstructure started in January 2010(P120-million repair under the President's Bridge Program).

== Education ==
The Sison Schools District Office governs all educational institutions within the municipality. It oversees the management and operations of all private and public, from primary to secondary schools.

=== Primary and elementary schools ===
- Agat Elementary School
- Alibeng Elementary School
- Artacho Elementary School
- Artacho UCCP Nursery/Kinder School
- Asan Sur Elementary School
- Bila Elementary School
- Binmeckeg Elementary School
- Bulaoen East Elementary School
- Bulaoen West Elementary School
- Cabaritan Elementary School
- Calunetan Elementary School
- Camangaan Elementary School
- Cauringan Elementary School
- Don Manuel I. Venezuela Elementary School
- Gorgordion Elementary School
- Inmalog Elementary School
- Labayug Elementary School
- Lily of the Valley Encounter (Love) Foundation Learning Center
- Pilawan Elementary School
- Pinalpal Elementary School
- Pindangan Elementary School
- Pinmilapil Elementary School
- Sagiutlang Elementary School
- Taratara Elementary School

=== Secondary schools ===
- Alibeng National High School
- Artacho National High School
- Alejandro F. Oligan High School (Asan Sur National High School)
- Amagbagan Integrated School
- Bantay Insik Integrated School
- Bulaoen East National High School
- Don Amadeo Perez National High School
- Don Valentin Torres Integrated School
- Dungon Integrated School
- Esperanza Integrated School
- Labayug National High School
- Pindangan National High School (Sison)
- Pinmilapil National High School
- Sagiutlang Integrated School
- Sison Central Integrated School

== Gallery ==
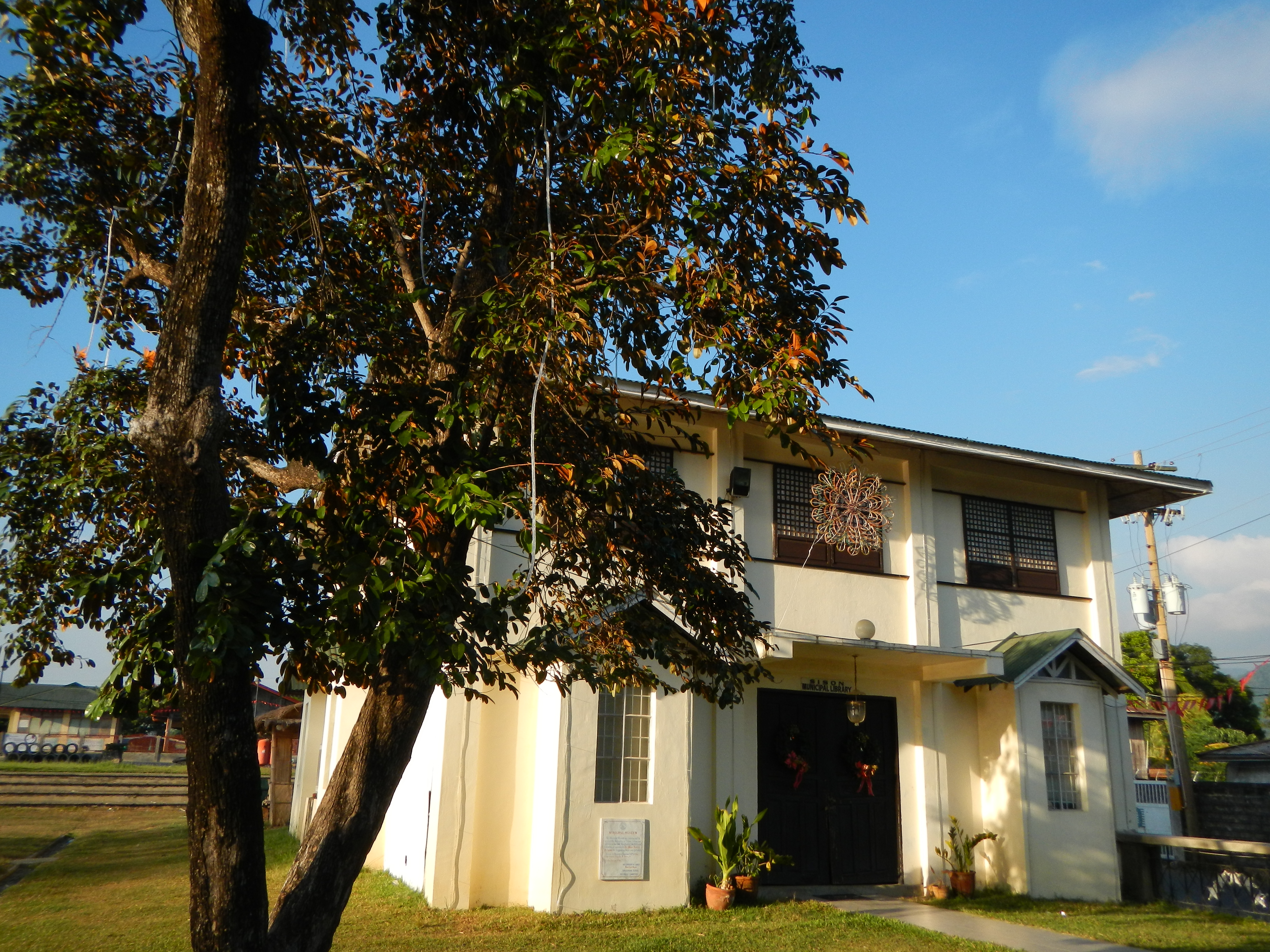
Municipal Library

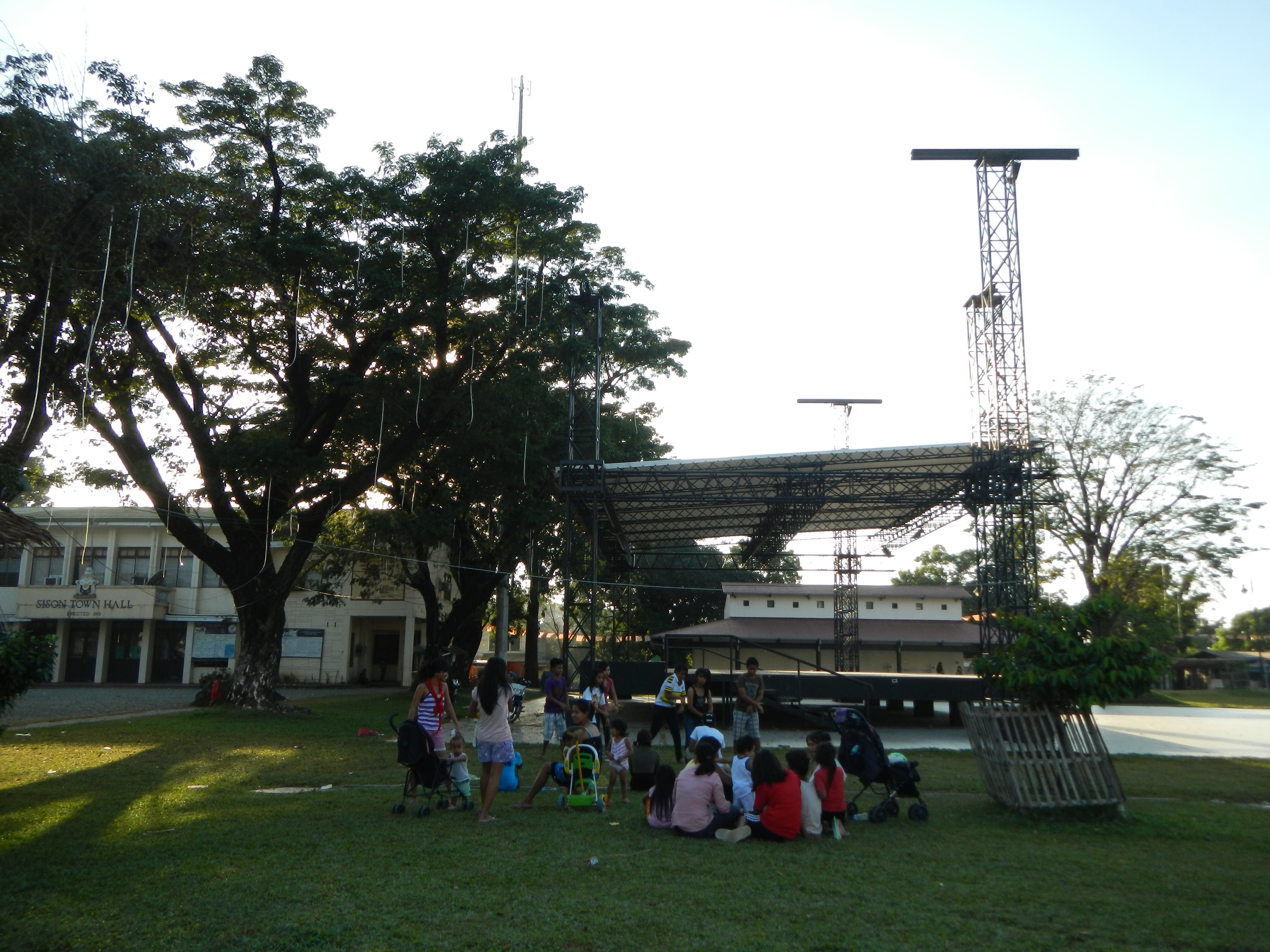
Town plaza and state or auditorium

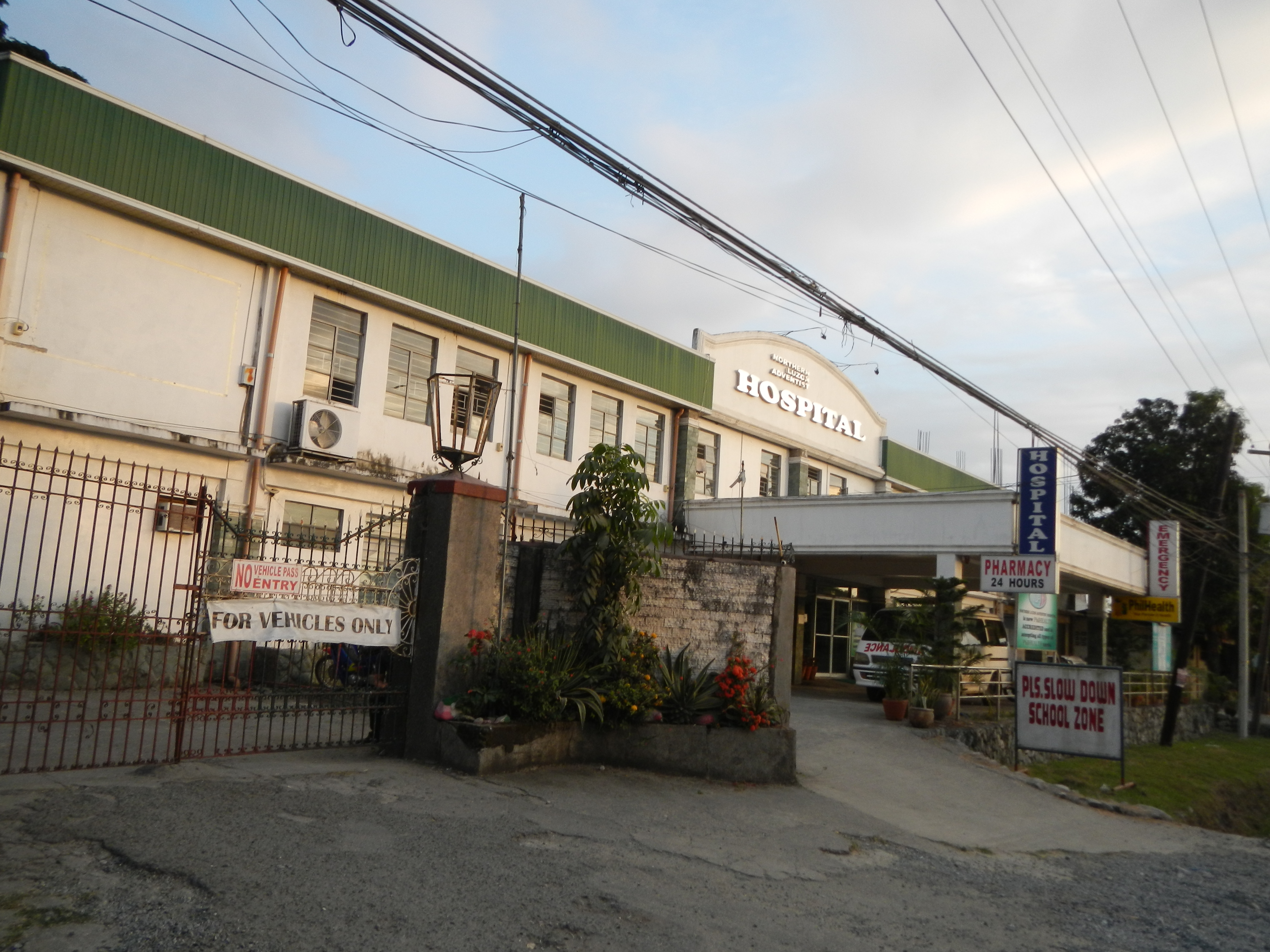
Northern Luzon Adventist Hospital

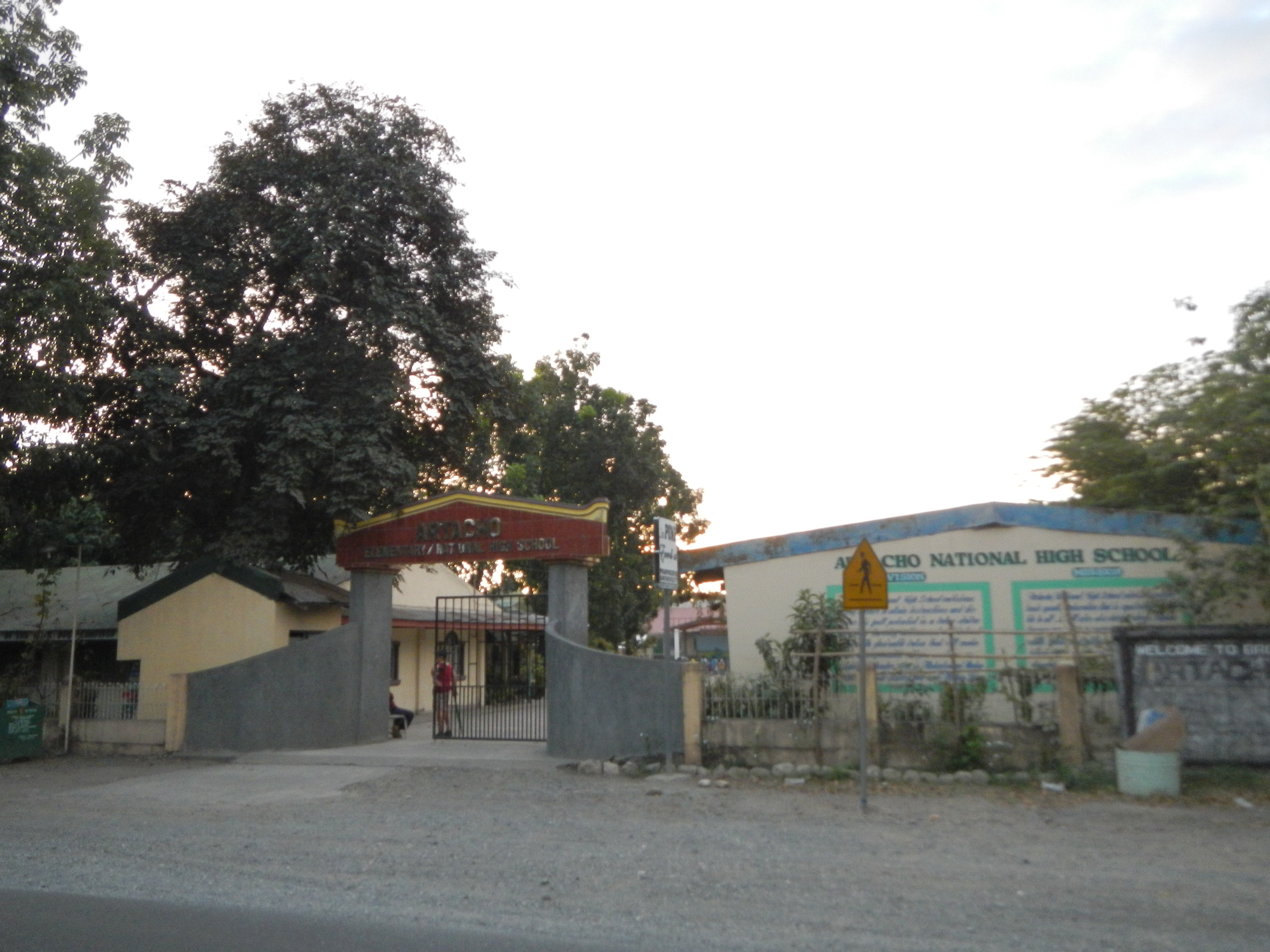
Artacho National High School
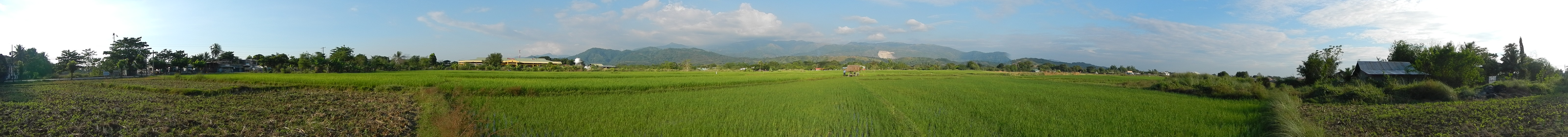
Panorama of the green fields

== See also ==
- List of renamed cities and municipalities in the Philippines
