= San Fabian, Pangasinan =

Municipality in Pangasinan, Philippines

San Fabian
- Municipality
- Municipality of San Fabian
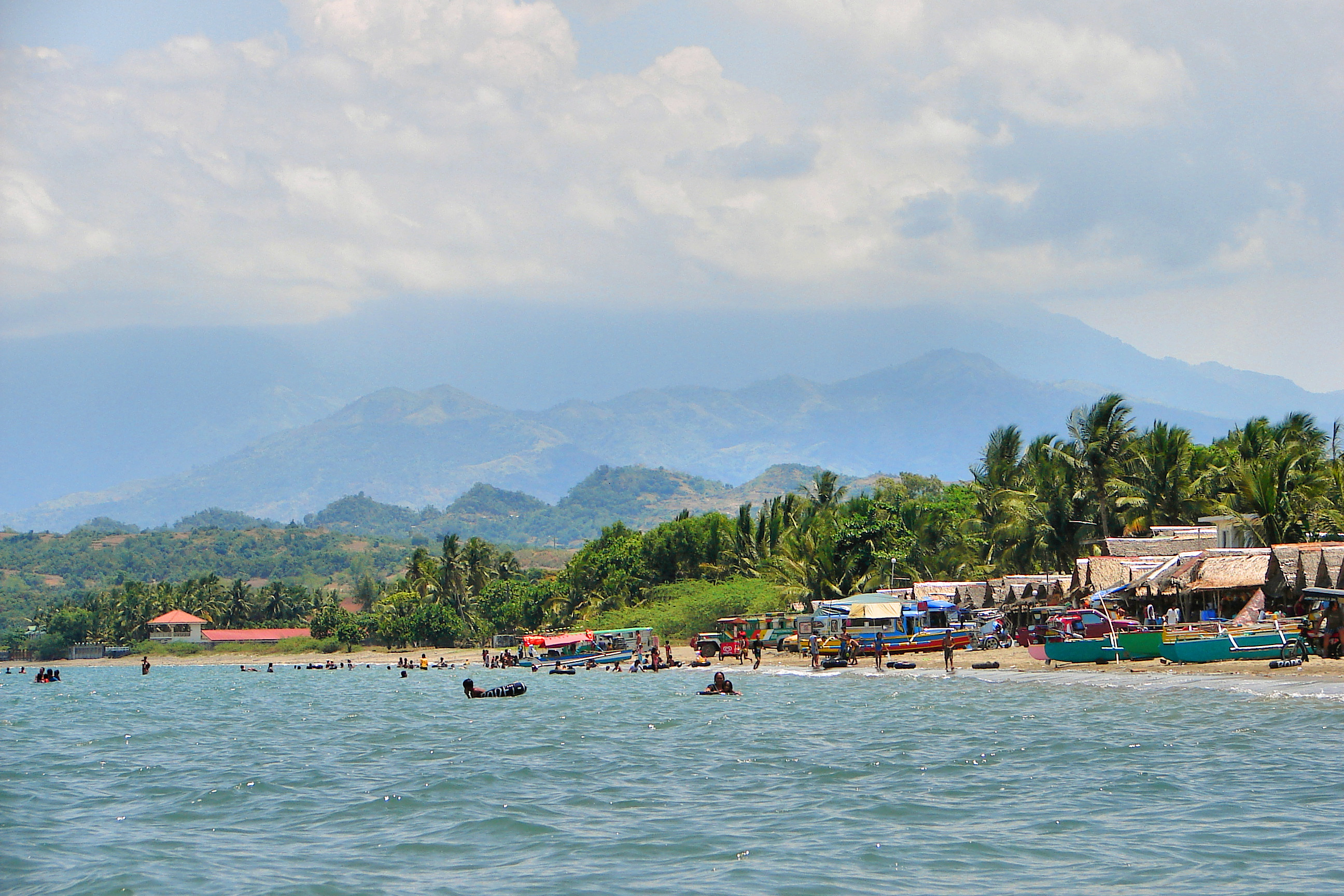
- Lingayen Gulf

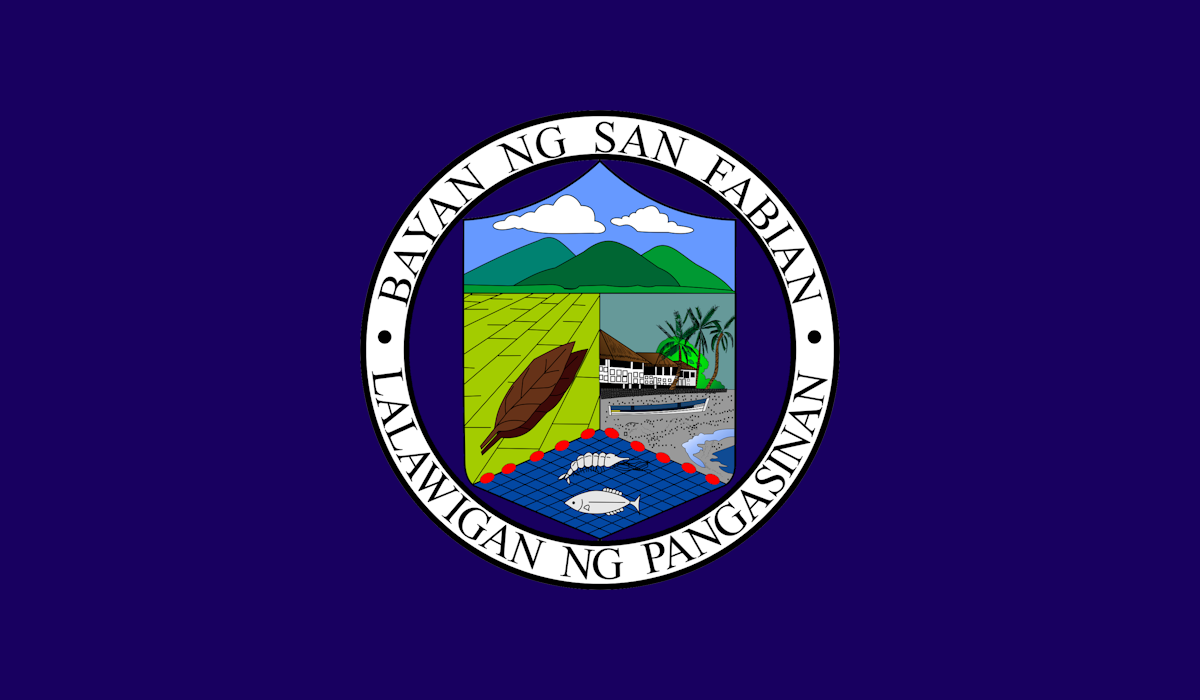
- Flag Seal
- Anthem: Baley Kon San Fabian
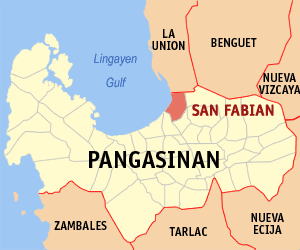
- Map of Pangasinan with San Fabian highlighted
- Interactive map of San Fabian
- Location within the Philippines
- Coordinates: 16°09′N 120°27′E
- Country: Philippines
- Region: Ilocos Region
- Province: Pangasinan
- District: 4th district
- Founded: March 21, 1717
- Named for: Pope Fabian
- Barangays: 34 (see Barangays)

Government
  - Type: Sangguniang Bayan
  - Mayor: Marlyn E. Agbayani
  - Vice Mayor: Constante B. Agbayani
  - Representative: Maria Georgina P. De Venecia
  - Municipal Council: Members: Fina I. Ibasan; Melody R. Rapallo-Erfe; Chelsea Mae N. Narvasa; Mamerto A. Malanum; Marieta C. Cuaresma; Hercules P. Magliba; Kimberly G. Bandarlipe; Rolando J. Pedralvez
  - Electorate: 56,888 voters (2025)

Area
  - Total: 81.28 km^{2} (31.38 sq mi)
- Elevation: 7.0 m (23.0 ft)
- Highest elevation: 110 m (360 ft)
- Lowest elevation: −3 m (−9.8 ft)

Population (2024 census)
  - Total: 87,714
  - Density: 1,079/km^{2} (2,795/sq mi)
  - Households: 22,669

Economy
  - Income class: 1st municipal income class
  - Poverty incidence: 13.06% (2023)
  - Revenue: ₱ 371.2 million (2024)
  - Assets: ₱ 1,158 million (2024)
  - Expenditure: ₱ 330.3 million (2024)
  - Liabilities: ₱ 166 million (2024)

Service provider
  - Electricity: Dagupan Electric Corporation (DECORP)
- Time zone: UTC+8 (PST)
- ZIP code: 2433
- PSGC: 0105533000
- IDD : area code: +63 (0)75
- Native languages: Pangasinan; Ilocano; Tagalog
- Website: www.sanfabian.gov.ph

San Fabian, officially the Municipality of San Fabian (Pangasinan: Baley na San Fabián; Ilocano: Ili ti San Fabián; Tagalog: Bayan ng San Fabián; Spanish: Municipio de San Fabián), is a municipality in the province of Pangasinan, Philippines. According to the 2024 census, it has a population of 87,714 people.

== Etymology ==
The town got its name after Saint Fabian during the Spanish era.

== History ==
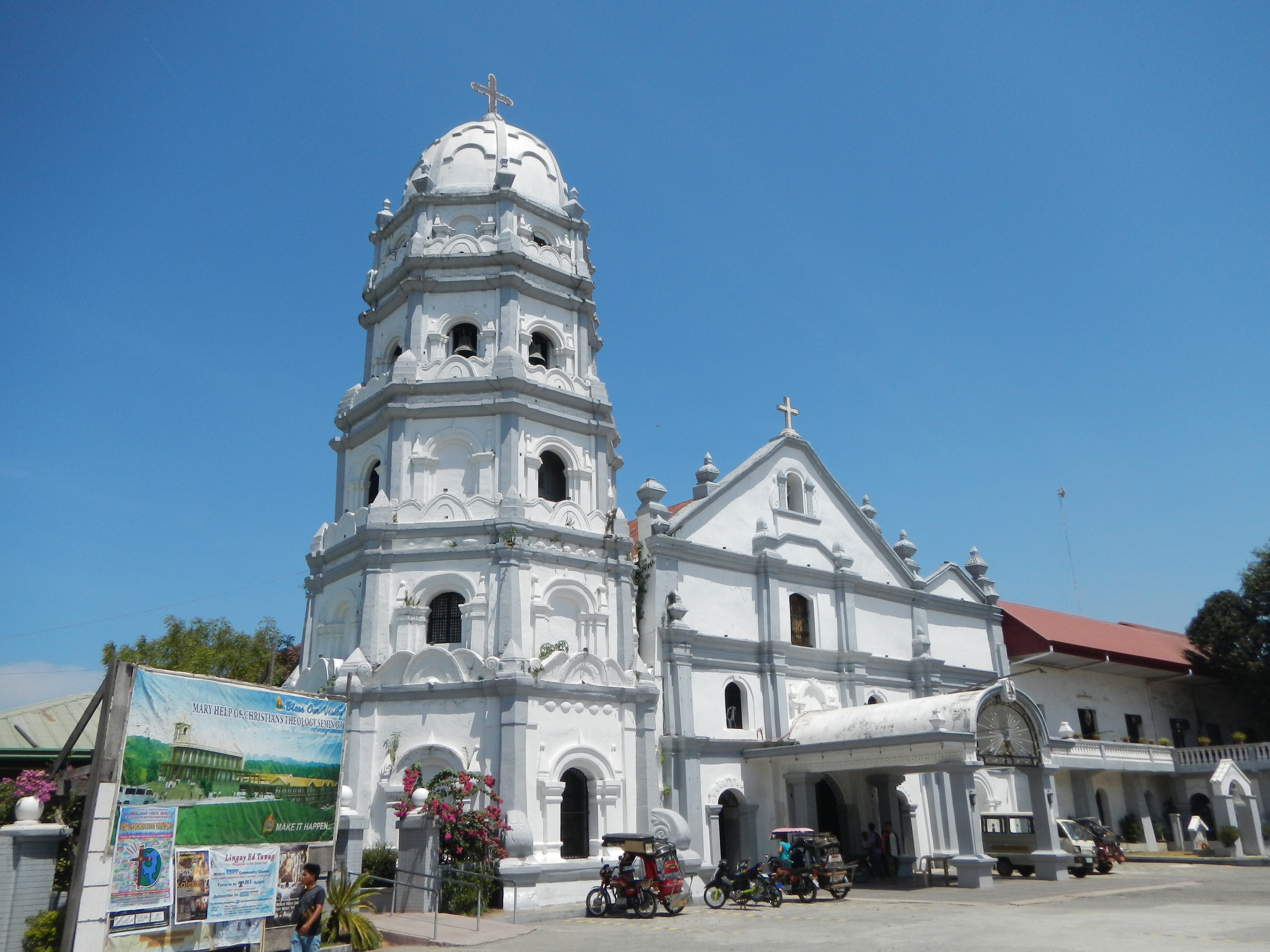
Saint Fabian parish church.

The town used to be called Angio, and had been a mission territory of friars of the Dominican Order during the Spanish era. It is named after Saint Fabian, who was a pontiff and saint of the Roman Catholic Church.

Around 1818, San Fabian had a boundary dispute with Mangaldan. The boundary between the two towns was the Angalacan river, which sometimes overflows because of floods. The boundary dispute was settled in 1900, when the mayor of San Fabian agreed to meet the mayor of Mangaldan and the two reached an agreement with a boundary marker being erected at Longos between the towns of San Fabian and Mangaldan. The agreement was signed by Juan Ulanday, Nicolas Rosa, Vicente Padilla, Marcelo Erfe, and approved by the American Commander Capt. Ferguson.

During the Philippine–American War, hundreds of Pangasinense soldiers and soldiers of the Philippine government died in San Fabian battling the Americans. After the pacification of Pangasinan by the United States, the first town President of San Fabian was Ińigo Dispo. In 1903, the town of Alava became a part of San Fabian and became a mere village or barrio.

During World War II, the liberation of US Naval and Marine forces in Pangasinan started when troops under Gen. Walter Krueger landed on Lingayen and San Fabian beaches. San Fabian landing zones were called White and Blue beaches, names which continue until the present time.

In October 2009, San Fabian was among the places heavily affected by the floods caused by the release of water by the San Roque Dam at Rosales during the height of Typhoon Pepeng.

== Geography ==
The Municipality of San Fabian is geographically located in the northern portion in Pangasinan, bordering the provincial boundaries of La Union. It has a land area of 8,129 hectares. It is bounded in the north by Rosario, Sison in the northeast, Mangaldan in the south, Pozorrubio and San Jacinto in the southeast, Dagupan in the southwest, and in the west by Lingayen Gulf.

San Fabian is situated 28.51 kilometres (17.72 mi) from the provincial capital Lingayen, and 215.15 kilometres (133.69 mi) from the country's capital city of Manila.

=== Barangays ===
San Fabian is politically subdivided into 34 barangays. Each barangay consists of puroks and some have sitios.

- Alacan
- Ambalangan-Dalin
- Angio
- Anonang
- Aramal
- Bigbiga
- Binday
- Bolaoen
- Bolasi
- Cabaruan
- Cayanga
- Colisao
- Gumot
- Inmalog Norte
- Inmalog Sur
- Lekep-Butao
- Lipit-Tomeeng
- Longos Central
- Longos Proper
- Longos-Amangonan-Parac-Parac Fabrica
- Mabilao
- Nibaliw Central
- Nibaliw East
- Nibaliw Magliba
- Nibaliw Narvarte (Nibaliw West Compound)
- Nibaliw Vidal (Nibaliw West Proper)
- Palapad
- Poblacion
- Rabon
- Sagud-Bahley
- Sobol
- Tempra-Guilig
- Tiblong
- Tocok

=== Climate ===
Climate data for San Fabian, Pangasinan
Month	Jan	Feb	Mar	Apr	May	Jun	Jul	Aug	Sep	Oct	Nov	Dec	Year
Mean daily maximum °C (°F)	31 (88)	31 (88)	33 (91)	34 (93)	34 (93)	33 (91)	32 (90)	31 (88)	31 (88)	32 (90)	31 (88)	31 (88)	32 (90)
Mean daily minimum °C (°F)	21 (70)	21 (70)	23 (73)	25 (77)	25 (77)	25 (77)	25 (77)	24 (75)	24 (75)	24 (75)	23 (73)	22 (72)	24 (74)
Average precipitation mm (inches)	4.3 (0.17)	19.1 (0.75)	27.3 (1.07)	45.2 (1.78)	153.3 (6.04)	271.3 (10.68)	411.1 (16.19)	532.0 (20.94)	364.2 (14.34)	182.5 (7.19)	56.3 (2.22)	24.4 (0.96)	2,091 (82.33)
Average rainy days	3	2	3	5	14	17	22	23	21	13	7	4	134
Source: World Weather Online

== Demographics ==
Population census of San Fabian
Year	Pop.	±% p.a.
1903	10,022	—
1918	15,845	+3.10%
1939	19,362	+0.96%
1948	23,997	+2.41%
1960	29,704	+1.79%
1970	35,014	+1.66%
1975	39,054	+2.21%
1980	42,018	+1.47%
1990	51,904	+2.14%
1995	59,904	+2.72%
2000	66,274	+2.19%
2007	74,005	+1.53%
2010	77,899	+1.88%
2015	83,025	+1.22%
2020	87,428	+1.09%
2024	87,714	+0.08%
Source: Philippine Statistics Authority

== Economy ==
Poverty incidence of San Fabian (%)

Source: Philippine Statistics Authority

== Government ==
=== Local government ===
San Fabian is part of the fourth congressional district of the province of Pangasinan. It is governed by a mayor, designated as its local chief executive, and by a municipal council as its legislative body in accordance with the Local Government Code. The mayor, vice mayor, and the councilors are elected directly by the people through an election which is being held every three years.

The present Mayor of San Fabian is Marlyn Espino-Agbayani, the second woman to be elected as the Local Chief Executive of the said town. Current Vice Mayor is former Mayor Constante Batrina Agbayani, the husband of the current Mayor. Former Vice Mayor Dr. Leopoldo N. Manalo is the only Vice Mayor to be elected and have completed the three-term limit on the said position. Former Mayor Irene F. Libunao is the first woman to be elected as Mayor in the municipality, who served from 2010 to 2013. Marinor Baltazar-De Guzman, the town's Vice Mayor from 2019 to 2022, became the first woman to be elected Board Member representing the 4th Provincial District of the Sangguniang Panlalawigan of Pangasinan.

=== Elected officials ===
Municipal Council of San Fabian (2025-2028)
Position	Officials	LGU Designation
Municipal Mayor	Marlyn E. Agbayani	Local Chief Executive
Municipal Vice Mayor	Constante B. Agbayani	Sangguniang Bayan Presiding Officer
Municipal Councilors	Fina I. Ibasan	Sangguniang Bayan Majority Floor Leader
Municipal Councilors	Melody R. Rapallo-Erfe	Sangguniang Bayan Assistant Majority Floor Leader
Municipal Councilors	Chelsea Mae N. Narvasa	Sangguniang Bayan Member
Municipal Councilors	Mamerto A. Malanum	Sangguniang Bayan Minority Floor Leader
Municipal Councilors	Marieta C. Cuaresma	Sangguniang Bayan Member
Municipal Councilors	Hercules P. Magliba	Sangguniang Bayan Assistant Majority Floor Leader
Municipal Councilors	Kimberly G. Bandarlipe-De Guzman	Sangguniang Bayan Member
Municipal Councilors	Rolando J. Pedralvez	Sangguniang Bayan Member
Municipal Councilors	David B. Agbayani	Sangguniang Bayan Ex-officio Member President, Liga ng mga Barangay - San Fabian; Punong Barangay, Mabilao
Municipal Councilors	Isaac Geneson S. Agbayani	Sangguniang Bayan Ex-officio Member President, Pambayang Pederasyon ng SK - San Fabian; Sangguniang Kabataan Chairperson, Barangay Mabilao

== Education ==
There are two schools district offices which govern all educational institutions within the municipality. These offices oversee the management and operations of all private and public, from primary to secondary schools. These are San Fabian I Schools District Office, and San Fabian II Schools District Office.

=== Primary and elementary schools ===
- Ambalangan Dalin ES
- Angio Elementary School
- Anonang Elementary School
- Aramal Elementary School
- Bigbiga Elementary School
- Binday Elementary School
- Bisbisocol Elementary School
- Bolasi Elementary School
- Cabaruan Elementary School
- East Central Elementary School
- Gumot Elementary School
- Inmalog Norte Elementary School
- Jose N. Juguilon Elementary School
- Lekep Elementary School
- Lipit-Tomeeng Elementary School
- Longos Elementary School
- Longos Proper Elementary School
- Mabilao Elementary School
- Marian School
- North Central Elementary School
- Palapad Elementary School
- Pangulong Marcos Elementary School
- Rabon Elementary School
- Sabangan Elementary School
- Salvador Elementary School
- San Fabian West Central Elementary School
- Sanitas Elementary School
- St. Blaise Christian School
- Teodora Cacapit Elementary School
- Tocok Elementary School
- Victorious Christian Academy

=== Secondary schools ===
- Ambalangan Dalin National High School
- Anonang National High School
- Binday National High School
- Mabilao National High School
- San Fabian Integrated School SPED Center
- San Fabian National High School

== Notable personalities ==
- Andres Narvasa, a former Chief Justice
- Perfecto V. Fernandez, a Filipino lawyer
- Bella Poarch, a Filipino-American singer and social media star

== Gallery ==
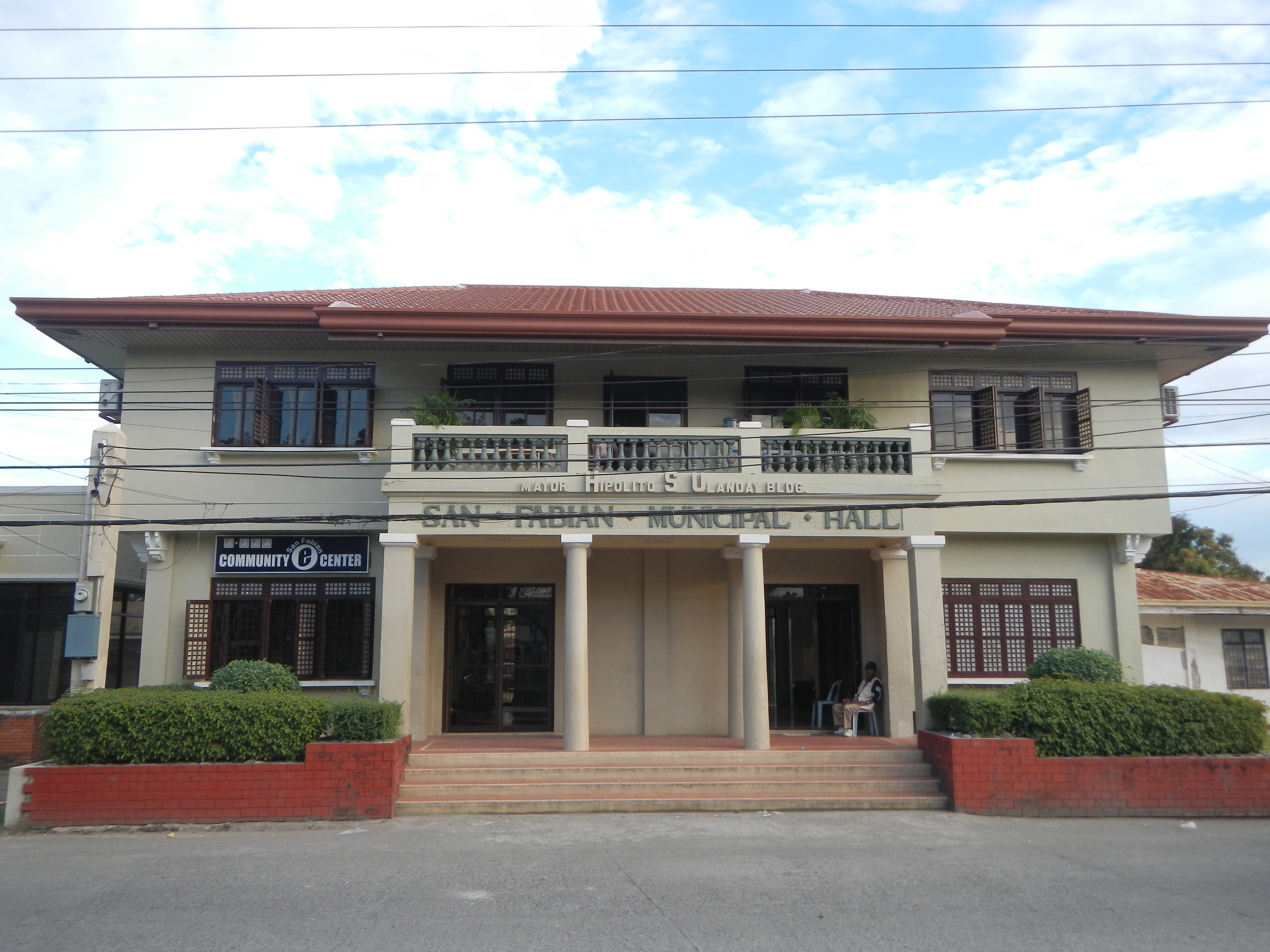
Bulwagan ng Sangguniang Bayan

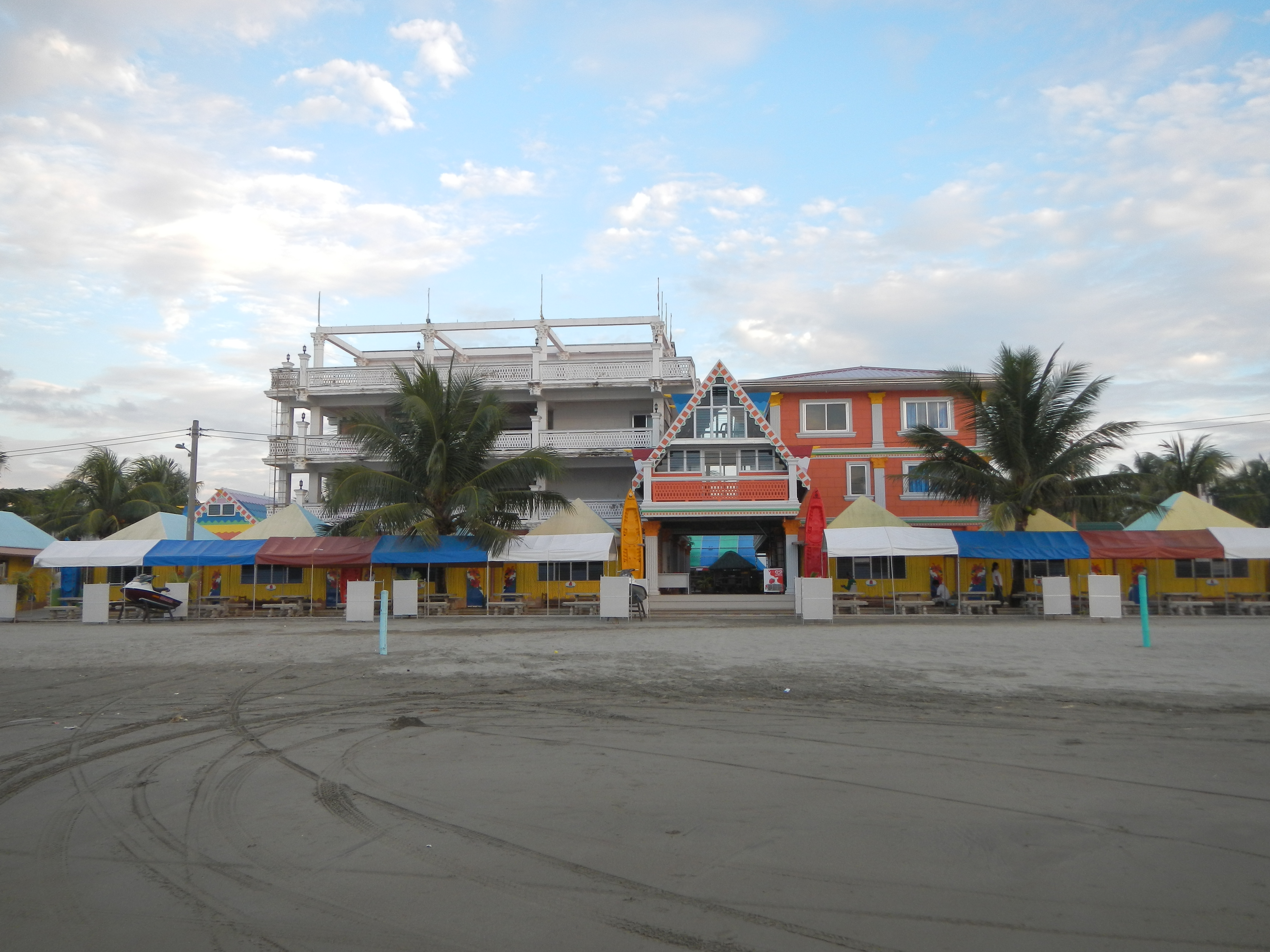
Amianan Boating World Resort

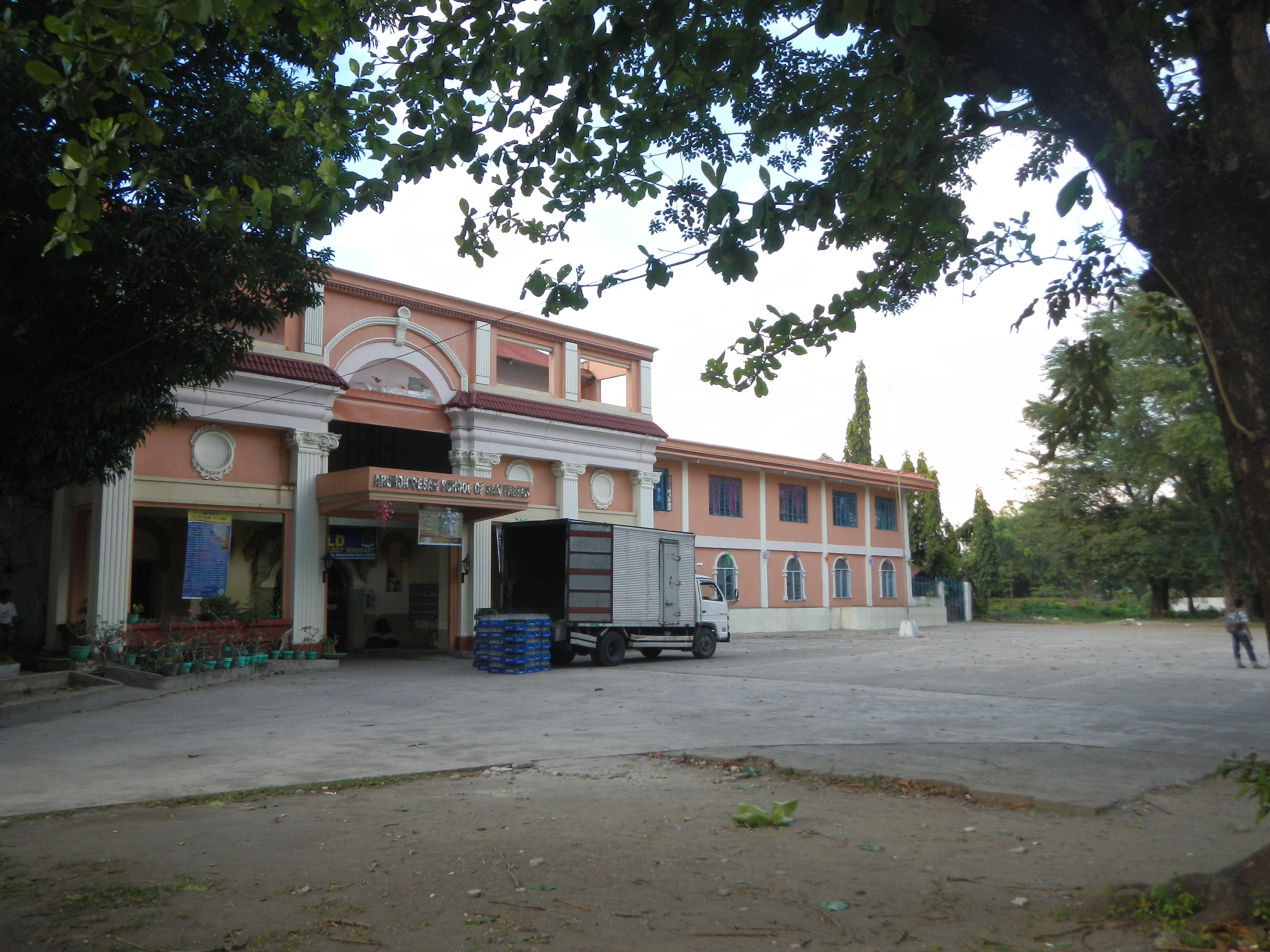
Archdiocesan School of San Fabián

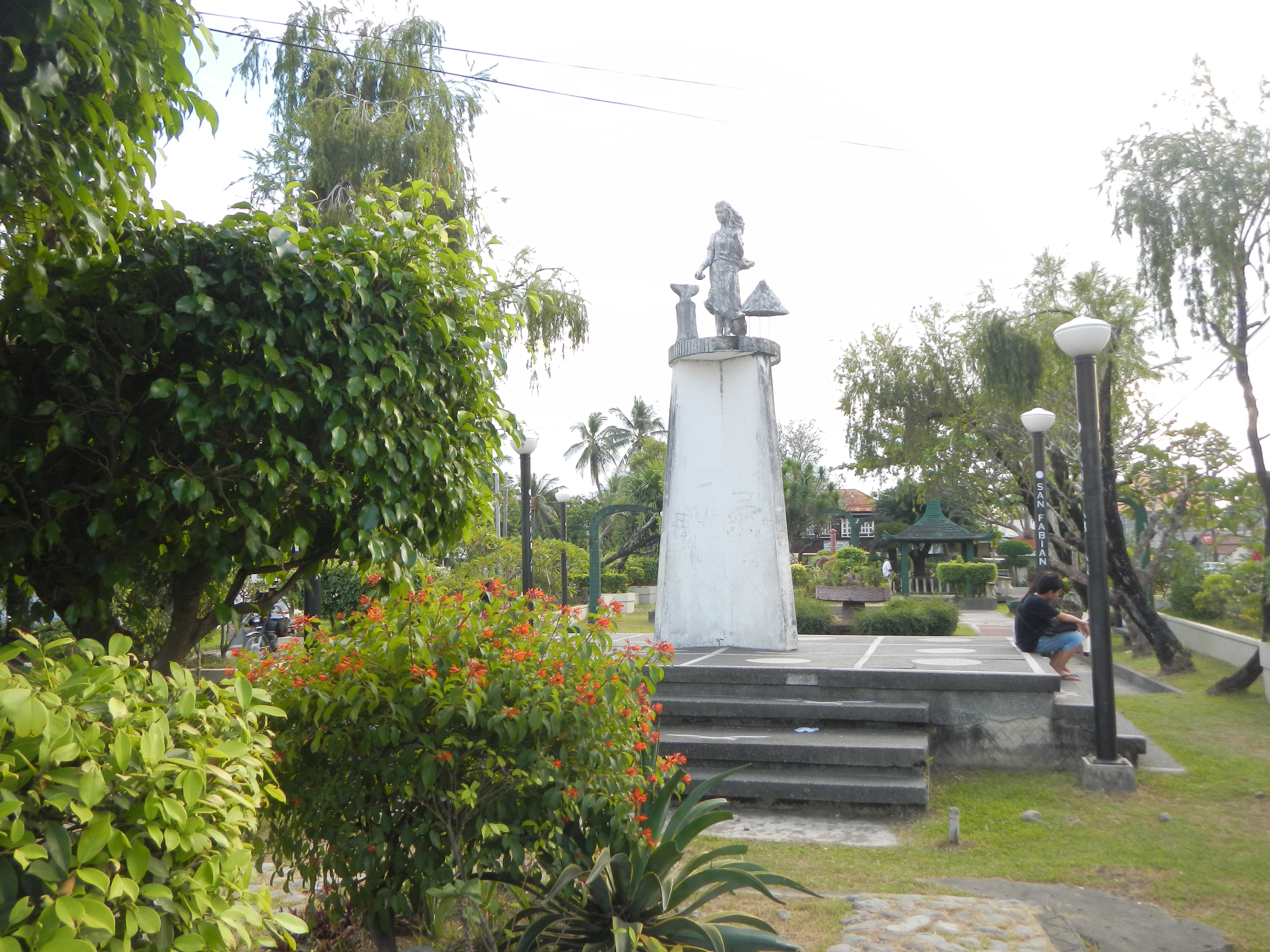
Monument in the Mutya ng Pilipinas Park
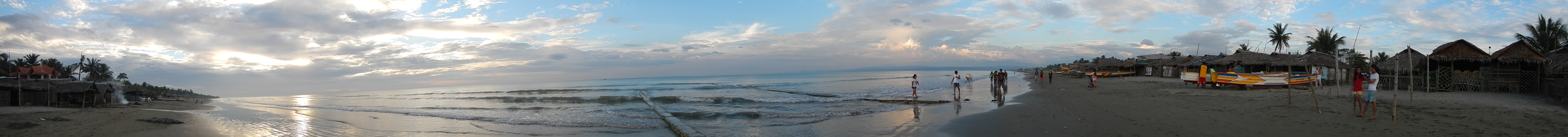
Panorama
