= Crushing plant =

A crushing plant is one-stop crushing installation, which can be used for rock crushing, garbage crushing, building materials crushing and other similar operations. Crushing plants may be either fixed or mobile. A crushing plant has different stations (primary, secondary, tertiary, ...) where different crushing, selection and transport cycles are done in order to obtain different stone sizes or the required granulometry.

== Components ==
Crushing plants make use of a large range of equipment, such as a pre-screener, loading conveyor, intake hopper, magnetic separator, crushing unit, such as jaw crushers, hammer crusher, impact crusher and cone crusher etc.

- Vibration feeder: These machines feed the jaw and impact crusher with the rocks and stones to be crushed.
- Crushers: These are the machines where the rocks and stones are crushed. There are different types of crushers for different types of rocks and stones and different sizes of the input and output material. Each plant would incorporate one or several crushing machines depending on the required final material (small stones or sand).
- Vibrating screen: These machines are used to separate the different sizes of the material obtained by the crushers.
- Belt conveyor: These elements are the belts used for transportation of the material from one machine to another during different phases of process.
- Central electric control system: Control and monitor the operation of the entire system.

== Process of crushing plant ==
1. Raw materials are evenly and gradually conveyed into jaw stone crushing equipment for primary crushing via the hopper of vibrating feeder.
2. The crushed stone materials are conveyed to crushing plant by belt conveyor for secondary crushing before they are sent to vibrating screen to be separated.
3. After separating, qualified materials will be taken away as final products, while unqualified materials will be carried back to the stone crushing equipment for recrushing. And customers can classify final products according to different size ranges. All the final products are up to the related standards within and beyond India. Of course, according to different requirements, customers can adjust the size of their final products from this stone crushing plant. Process of Stone Crushing Plant
4. Clients will get the satisfactory products after objects being crushed for several times. Dust is generated during the working process while the dust control units are needed.

== See also ==
- Crusher
