= Pugo, La Union =

Municipality in La Union, Philippines

Pugo
- Municipality
- Municipality of Pugo
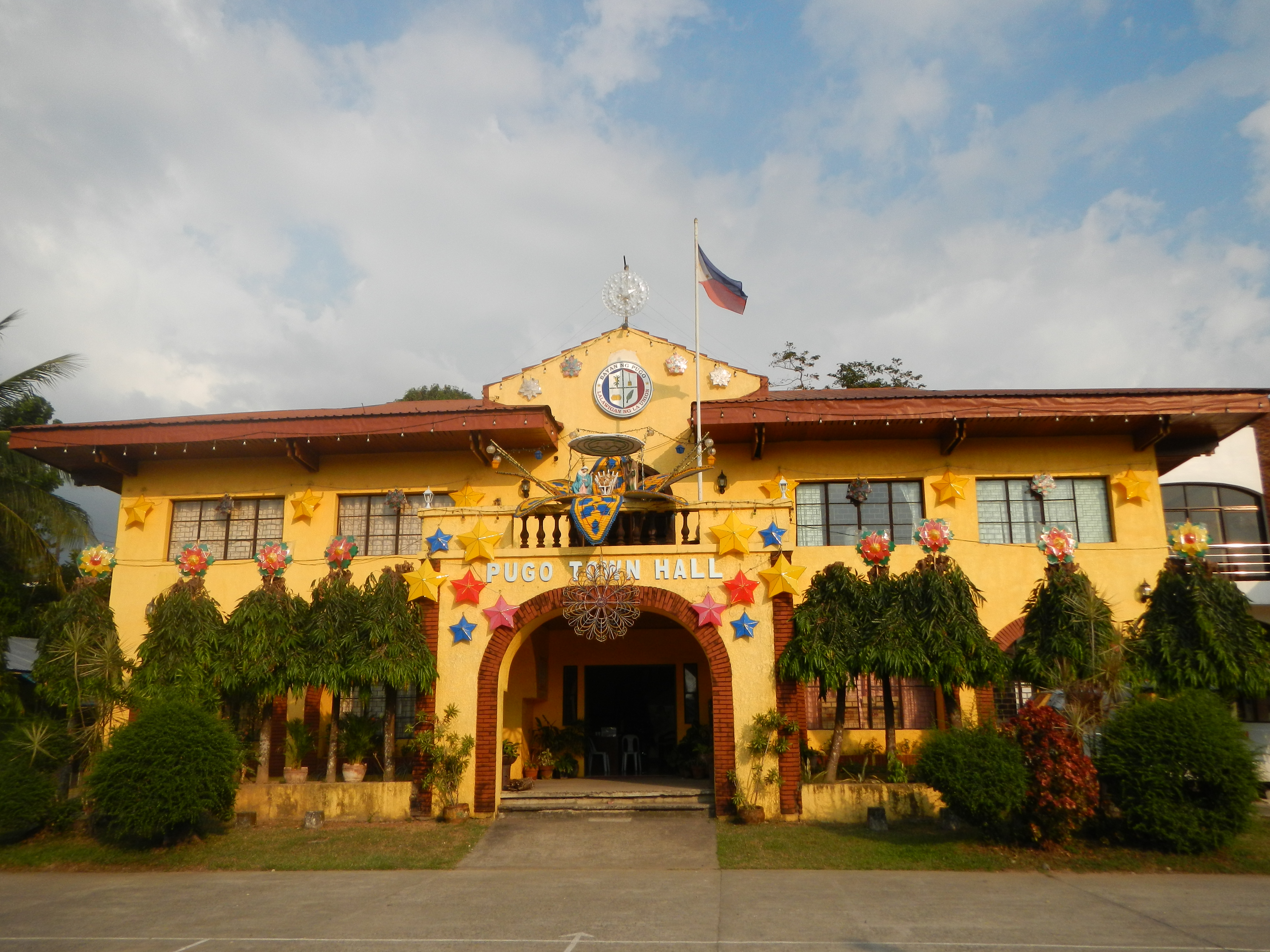
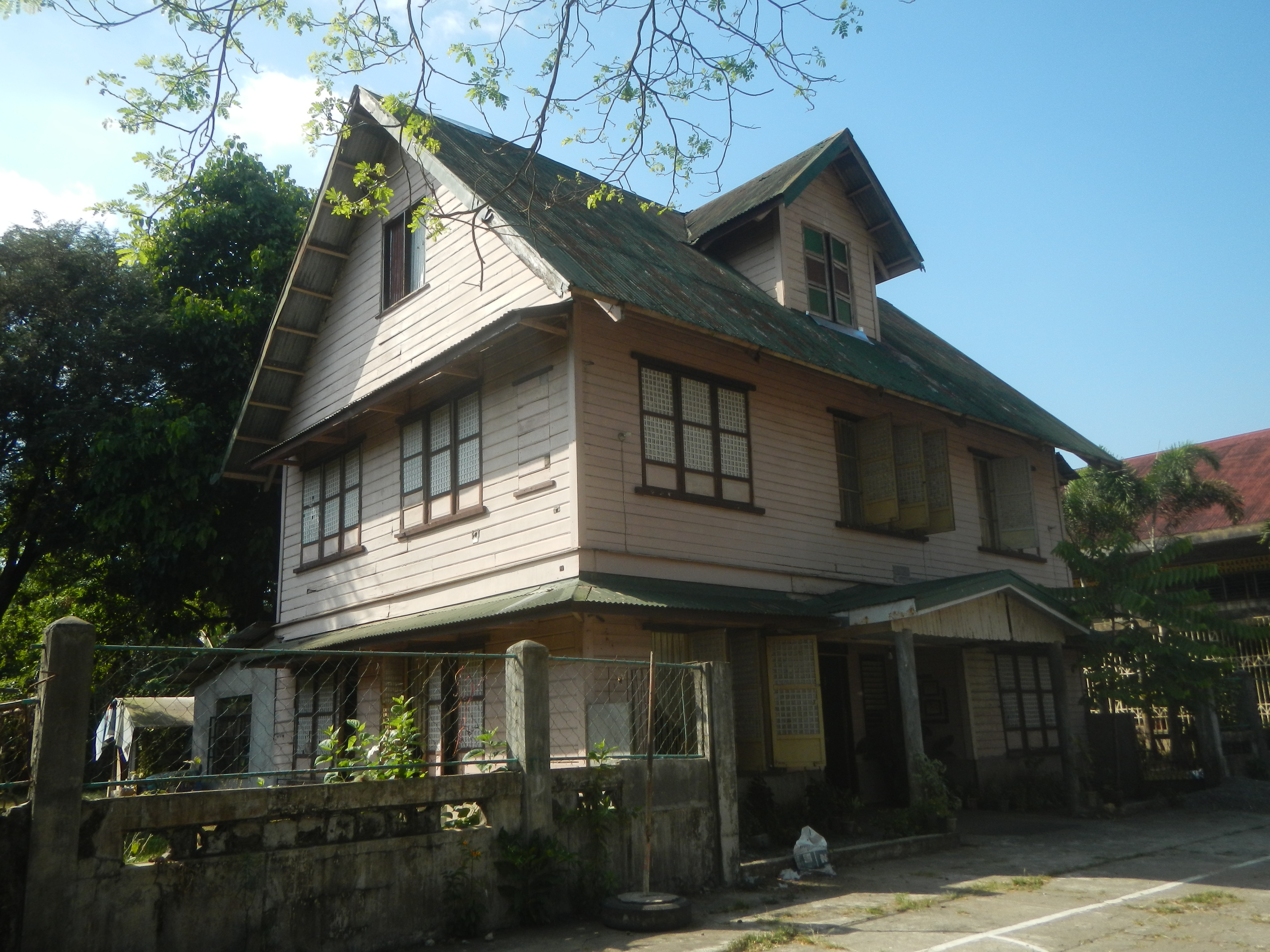
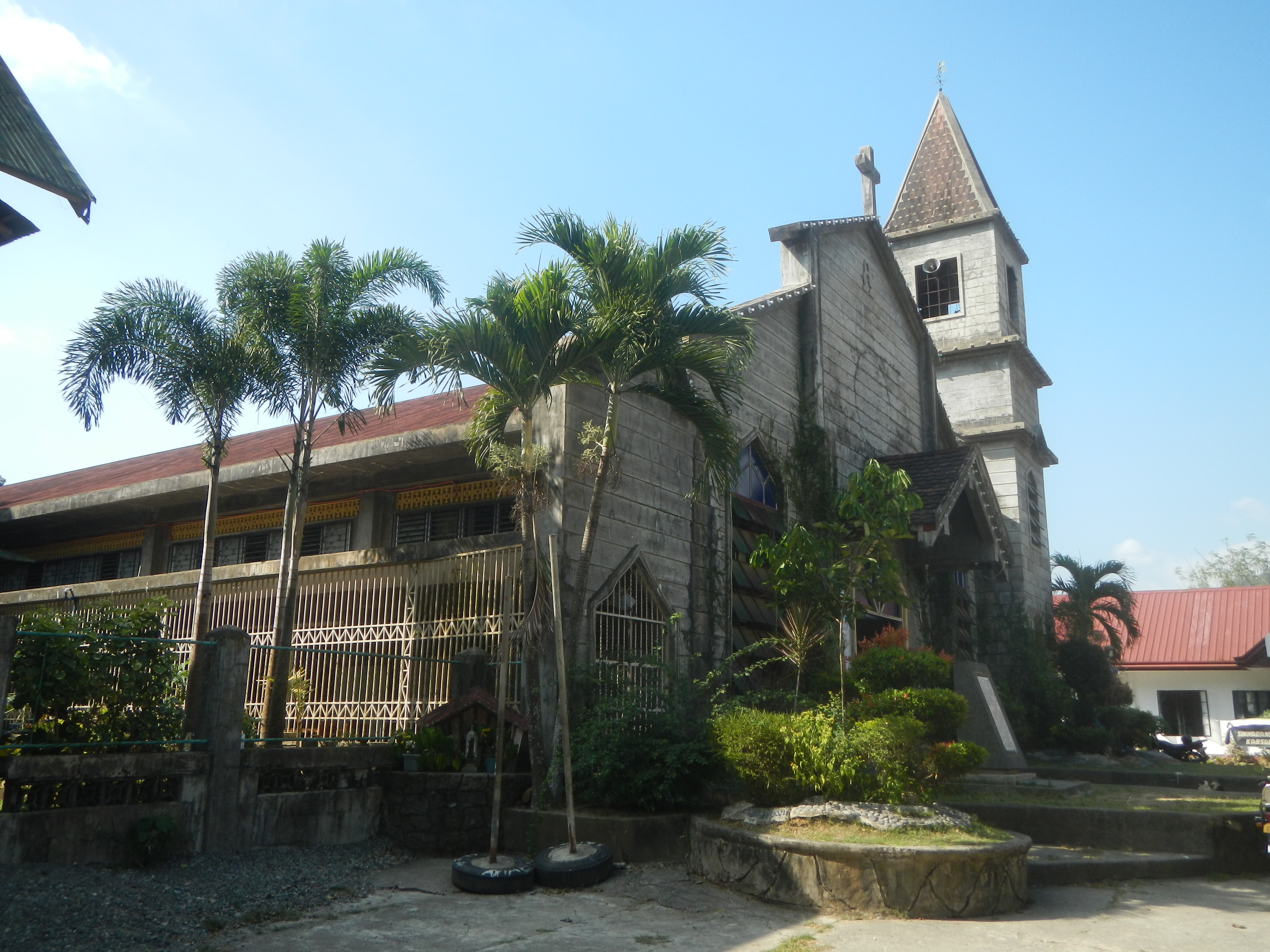
- Municipal Hall, Museo de Pugo and The Holy Family Parish Church

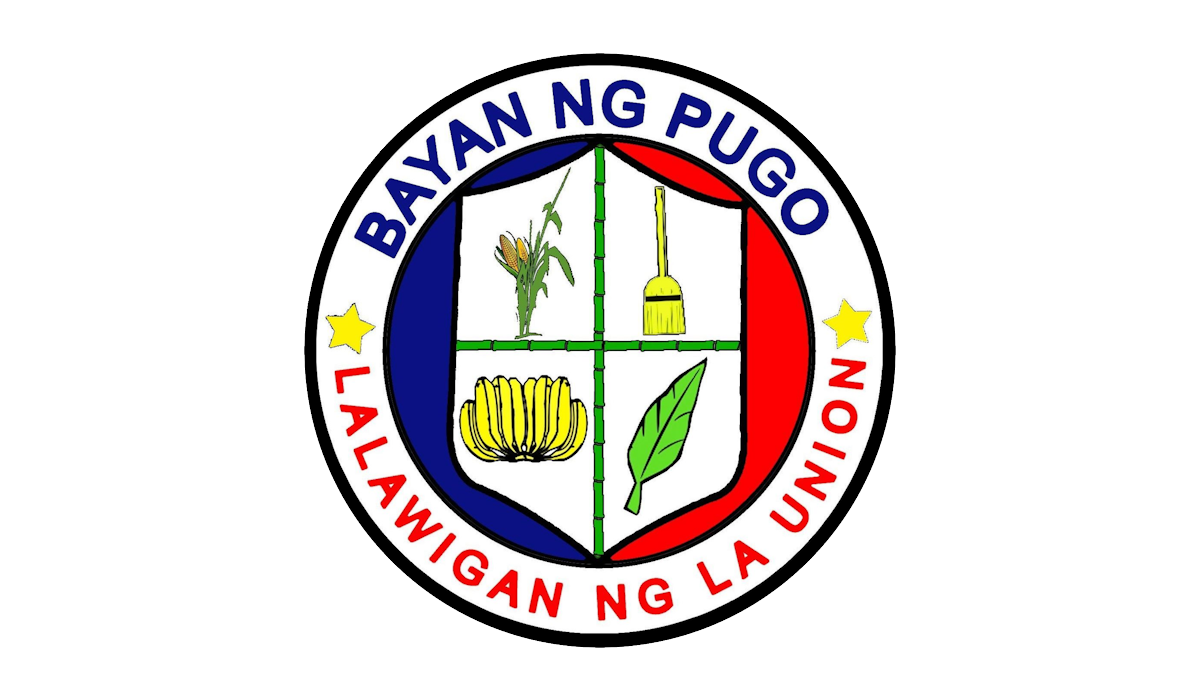
- Flag Seal

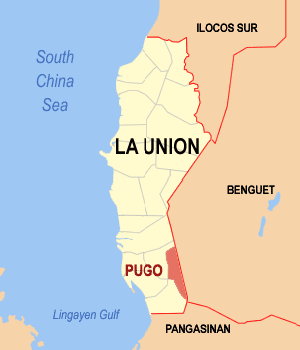
- Map of La Union with Pugo highlighted
- Interactive map of Pugo
- Location within the Philippines
- Coordinates: 16°17′N 120°29′E
- Country: Philippines
- Region: Ilocos Region
- Province: La Union
- District: 2nd district
- Founded: 1912
- Barangays: 14 (see Barangays)

Government
  - Type: Sangguniang Bayan
  - Mayor: Geralyn "Erang" G. Bulao
  - Vice Mayor: Isidro G. Dacpano
  - Representative: Dante S. Garcia
  - Municipal Council: Members: Jose "Ukala" G. Basallo; Betty Balluguing - Ramos; Jonnel B. Dacpano; Vivian Boado; Modesto Laroya; Reynaldo "Rene" Boado; Jeffrey Leprozo; Rolando Madriaga
  - Electorate: 14,805 voters (2025)

Area
  - Total: 62.84 km^{2} (24.26 sq mi)
- Elevation: 213 m (699 ft)
- Highest elevation: 782 m (2,566 ft)
- Lowest elevation: 26 m (85 ft)

Population (2024 census)
  - Total: 19,107
  - Density: 304.1/km^{2} (787.5/sq mi)
  - Households: 4,953

Economy
  - Income class: 3rd municipal income class
  - Poverty incidence: 9.32% (2023)
  - Revenue: ₱ 164.2 million (2024)
  - Assets: ₱ 699 million (2024)
  - Expenditure: ₱ 127 million (2024)
  - Liabilities: ₱ 97.33 million (2024)

Service provider
  - Electricity: La Union Electric Cooperative (LUELCO)
- Time zone: UTC+8 (PST)
- ZIP code: 2508
- PSGC: 0103312000
- IDD : area code: +63 (0)72
- Native languages: Ilocano; Pangasinan; Tagalog
- Website: www.pugo.gov.ph

Pugo ([pʊˈgoʔ]), officially the Municipality of Pugo (Ilocano: Ili ti Pugo; Pangasinan: Baley na Pugo; Filipino: Bayan ng Pugo), is a landlocked municipality in the province of La Union, Philippines. According to the 2024 census, it has a population of 19,107 people.

== Etymology ==
Two prominent theories on the origin of the name "Pugo" is reflect both the natural environment and the linguistic heritage of the area.

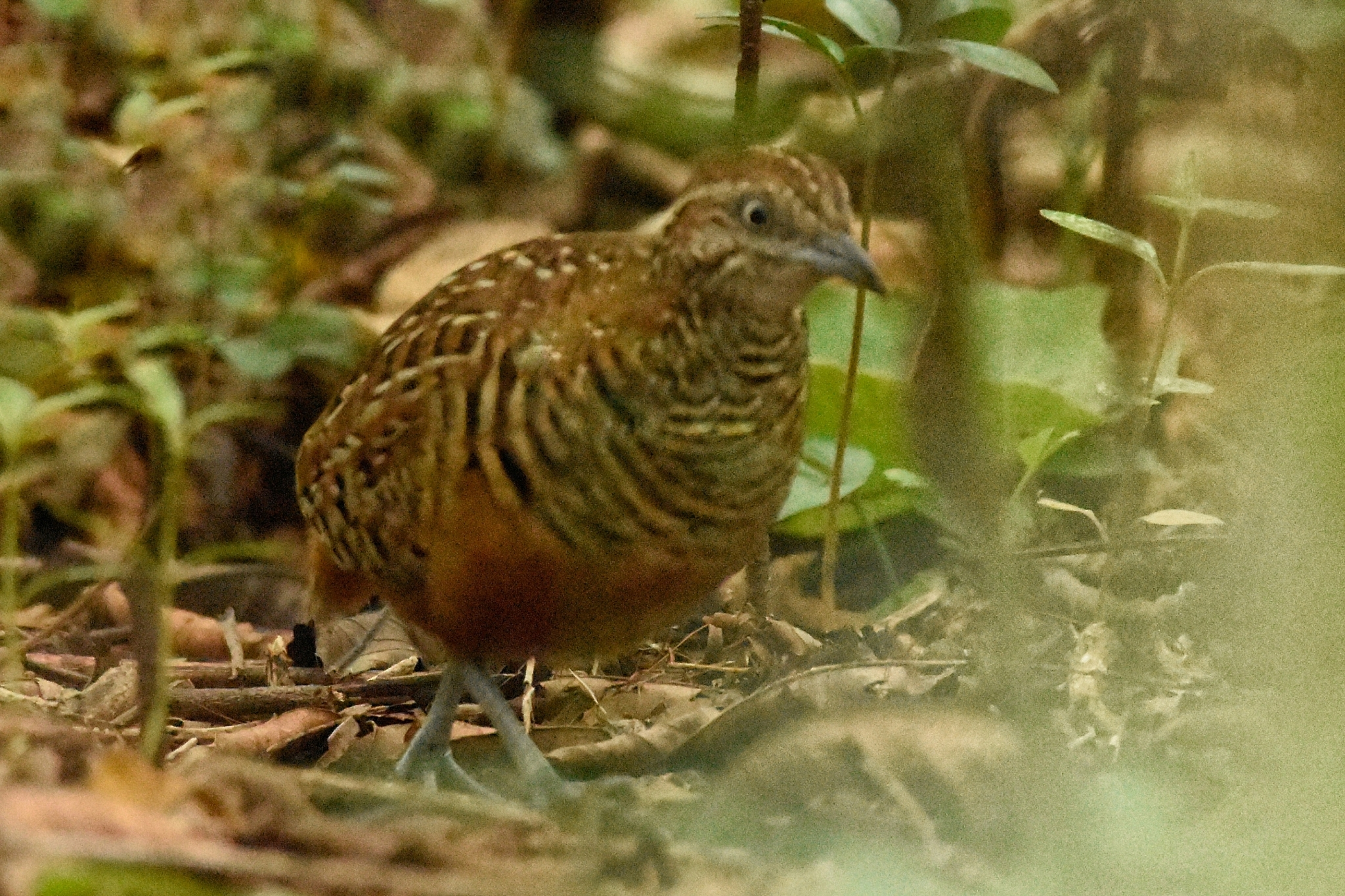
Quail bird locally known as pugo

The first theory traces the name back to the Spanish colonial period when the area, then known as Ranchería Tulosa, was a well-known hunting ground for the quail bird specifically the Luzon buttonquail (Turnix worcesteri), an endemic bird species locally called "pugo" in the Iloco language. These birds were abundant in the forested and grassy plains of the region, which attracted hunters. Over time, hunters began to refer to the area as Ranchería Pugo.

The second theory suggests that the name "Pugo" comes from the Pangasinan word meaning "islet." While the town itself is not an island, the term is thought to describe the large rock beds and boulders found in the Tapuacan River. These geological formations, resembling small islets, are a distinctive feature of the river that flows through the town, shaping its unique landscape.

== History ==
=== Early history ===
The narrow plain along the Ifugao River, surrounded by the foothills of the Cordillera Central mountains, was home to an early settlement of indigenous peoples, primarily the Ibaloi. These people migrated from the inner parts of Benguet and formed small communities alongside the ethnic Pangasinan. The region thrived with a vibrant animist-pagan culture and religion.

The rivers in the area played a crucial role as pathways along the gold trail known as the Aringay-Tonglo-Balatok gold trail. The Ifugao River, in particular, flowed into a delta that led to a key trading settlement, Alinguey (now Aringay). This settlement connected highland and lowland communities, with gold serving as the primary commodity of trade. Trade in this region involved a diverse array of traders and merchants, including Cordillerans (Igorots), Ilocanos, Pangasinans, Tagalogs, and even foreigners from China, Japan, and Maritime Southeast Asia.

=== Spanish Colonization ===
In June 1572, when the colonial Spaniards arrived, they successfully pacified and subjugated the locals and foreign merchants in Agoo to their authority and Christianity in the name of the Spanish monarch. This effort was led by the conquistador Juan de Salcedo, who established a settlement. By 1578, a permanent settlement was established in Agoo when two Franciscan missionaries, Friar Juan Bautista Lucarelli of Italy and Friar Sebastian de Baeza of Spain, commissioned the construction of a thatch and bamboo church in honor of Saint Francis of Assisi. Agoo encompassed a vast land area, including Pugo as its territory.

By the 1700s, the area became a ranchería called Tulosa and was designated as a visita (satellite mission station) under the jurisdiction of the larger church district in Agoo. The majority of the people of the ranchería were ethnic Pangasinan and Christianized Cordillerans. Due to population pressure and the oppressive conditions under Spanish rule, Ilocano migrants from the Ilocos provinces and nearby towns began settling in the coastal areas of La Union. Initially arriving in Agoo and Aringay (then part of Pangasinan province), they gradually moved inland to the fertile plains of Pugo.

They settled, cultivated lands for agriculture, and improved the settlement. Intermarriage between the Ilocano settlers and the Pangasinan-speaking and other natives led to cultural assimilation, resulting in the population becoming predominantly Ilocanized in culture and language.

On October 1849, Governor-General Narciso Clavería issued a decree creating La Union province by merging towns from Pangasinan, Ilocos Sur, and the Cordillera (La Montañosa). This was formalized on March 2, 1850, by Governor-General Antonio María Blanco, with Ranchería Tulosa, a ranchería of San Isidro de Tubao and a barrio of Agoo and Aringay, as a founding town. The province’s creation was confirmed by Queen Isabella II on April 18, 1854.

By the 1880s, the Ranchería Tulosa, then part of Barrio San Isidro de Tubao and still a visita of Agoo, was known as a hunting ground for quail birds, locally referred to as pugo. By 1883, quail hunters renamed the area Ranchería Pugo due to the abundance of the bird. On July 20, 1885, Tubao was officially established as a town through a Superior Decreto by Governor Federico Francia, recognizing Tubao as the "nuevo pueblo de Tubao." During this time, Ranchería Pugo became a barrio under the jurisdiction of Tubao.

=== Philippine Revolution ===
During the Philippine Revolution, the barrio locals actively participated in the fight for independence against Spanish colonial rule. Under the leadership of General Manuel Tinio y Bondoc, a close ally of Emilio Aguinaldo, the locals engaged in significant resistance efforts in Northern Luzon. They attacked Spanish garrisons in several towns of La Union, particularly the convents in Agoo and San Fernando. Spanish authorities and priests were forced to flee to Vigan and Manila.

=== American Colonization ===
The independence of the Philippines from Spain was short-lived, as the Philippine-American War soon followed. In 1899, Pugo and Tubao became a center of resistance against American forces. Guerrilla Unit No. 5, under the leadership of Captain Santiago Fontanilla, operated in the area and its neighboring towns of Agoo, Aringay, Santo Tomas, and Rosario. On November 20, 1899, American forces led by General Samuel Baldwin Marks Young, the American commander in Northern Luzon, arrived in La Union. Guerrilla warfare ensued in pursuit of General Emilio Aguinaldo and his forces, leading to decisive battles in La Union, including in Pugo.

By 1901, La Union was fully under American control. In 1909, Barrio Pugo, together with seven other barrios (Ambangonan, Dagupan, Maoasoas, Enmistampa, San Luis, Cuenca, and Saytan), was annexed to Mountain Province as per Executive Order No. 11, with Barrio Pugo serving as the seat of government.

By January 1, 1912, Pugo was officially organized as a town under the sub-province of Benguet, Mountain Province, in accordance with Executive Order No. 77 dated December 11, 1911, approved by Governor-General S. Cameron Forbes. When Baguio became a city in 1910, Barrio Pugo and the other barrios became part of the township of Twin Peaks, Benguet. Later, Twin Peaks was abolished, and Pugo and Tuba became separate townships.

On February 4, 1920, Pugo, which was then a municipal district of Benguet, was restored to La Union, along with other barrios and sitios previously annexed to Mountain Province. This was in accordance with Section 2 of Act No. 2877, series 1920, enacted by the Philippine Senate and House of Representatives.

=== Japanese Occupation ===
In December 1941, Japanese forces attacked the town, bombing residential areas and U.S. military installations. The town became a center for evacuees from neighboring municipalities. Its mountainous terrain provided an ideal site for guerrillas fighting the Japanese forces. On December 22, 1941, the Japanese occupation in the province began.

By January 1945, American forces launched a successful campaign during the Battle of Lingayen Gulf, marking the turning point in liberating Northern Luzon from Japanese control. Pugo was officially freed in March 1945 following the Battle of Bacsil Ridge in San Fernando, La Union, which signified the full liberation of the province from Japanese occupation.

=== Post-war Era ===
By virtue of Executive Order No. 72 signed by President Manuel Roxas on July 30, 1947, the municipal district of Pugo, along with Sudipen and San Gabriel, was organized into a regular municipality. As a result, the fourteen municipalities of La Union, all established under the Revised Administrative Code, were increased to seventeen.

== Geography ==
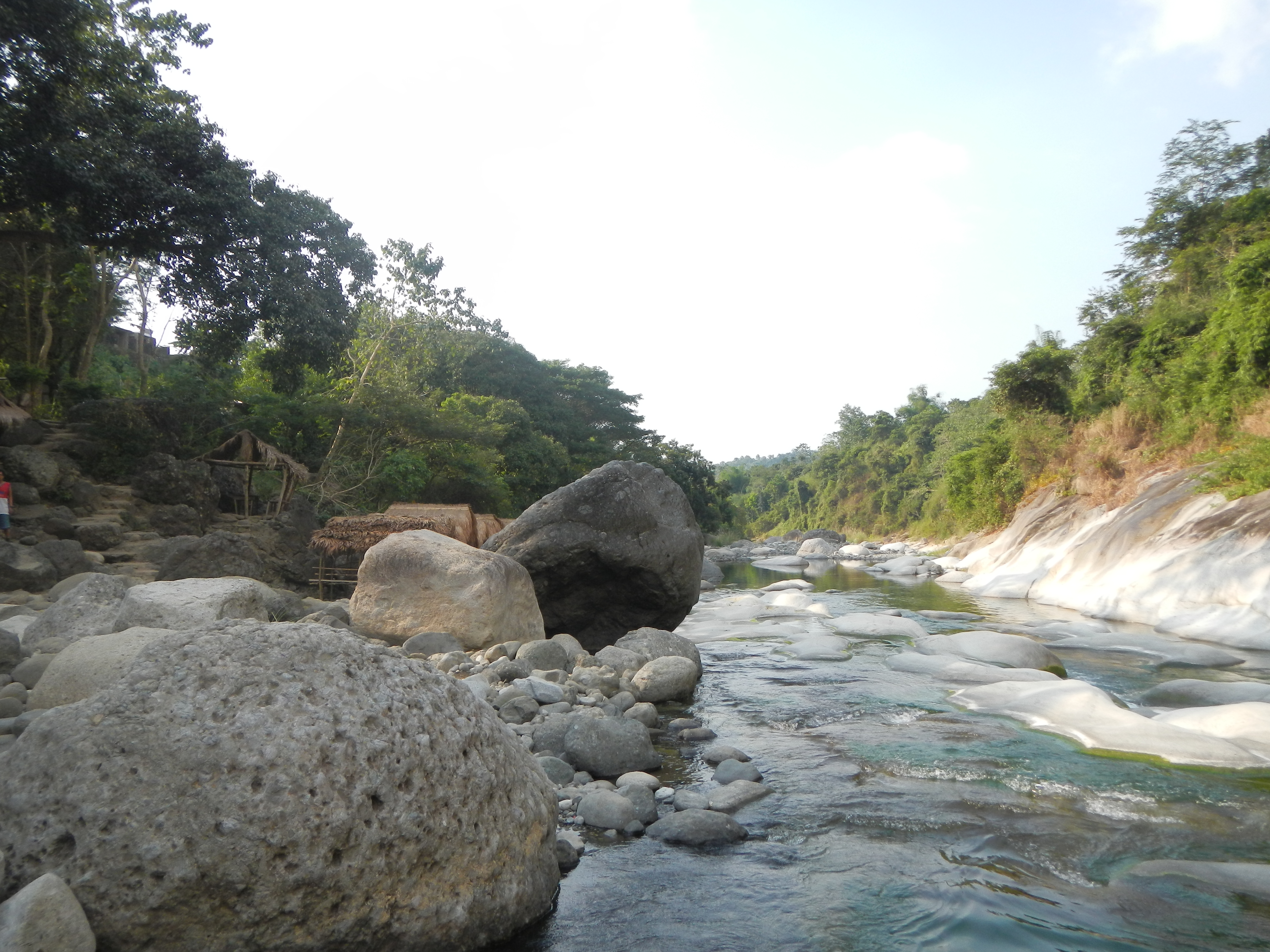
Boulders in Tapuacan River

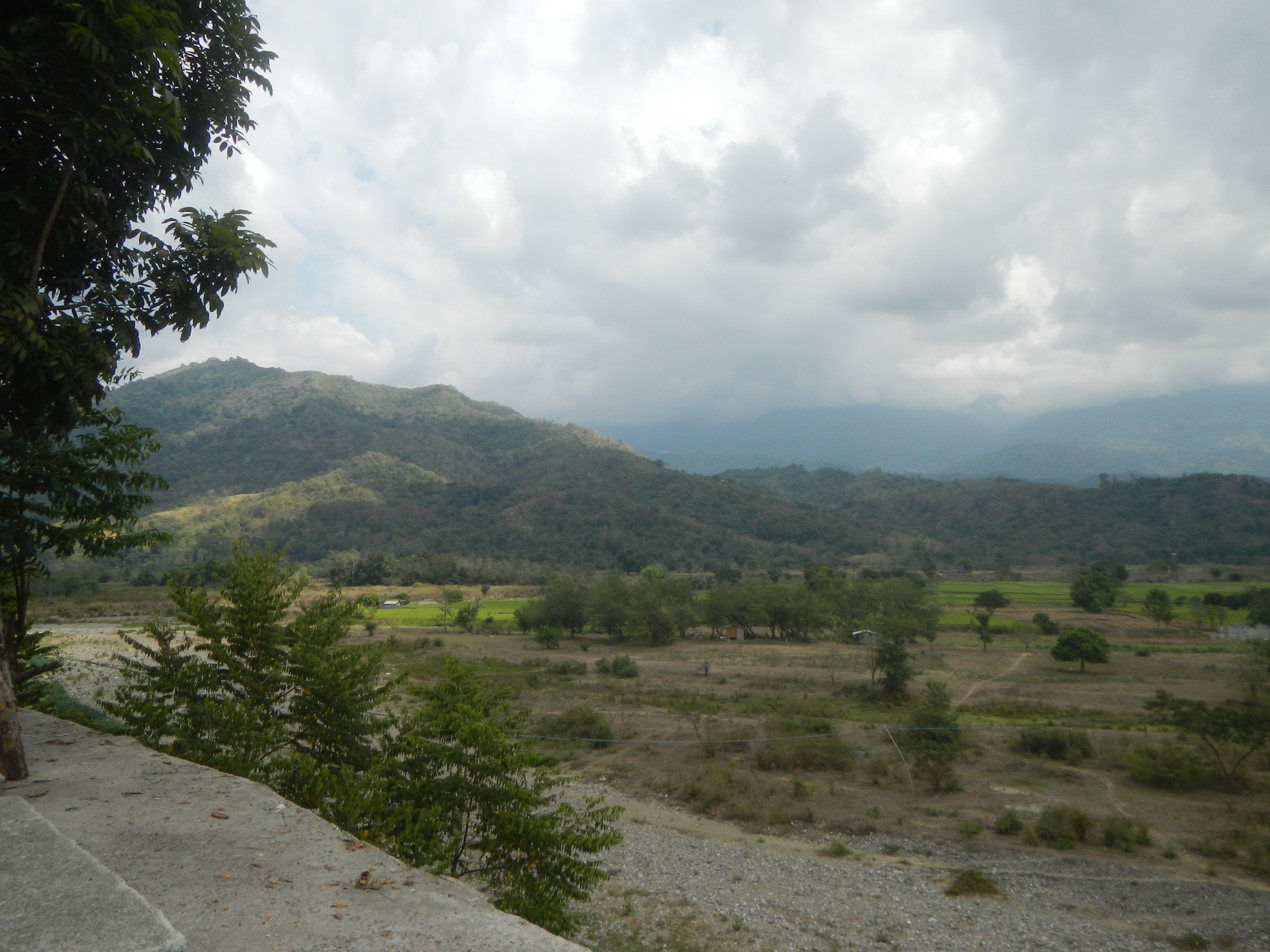
Pugo Landscape Terrain

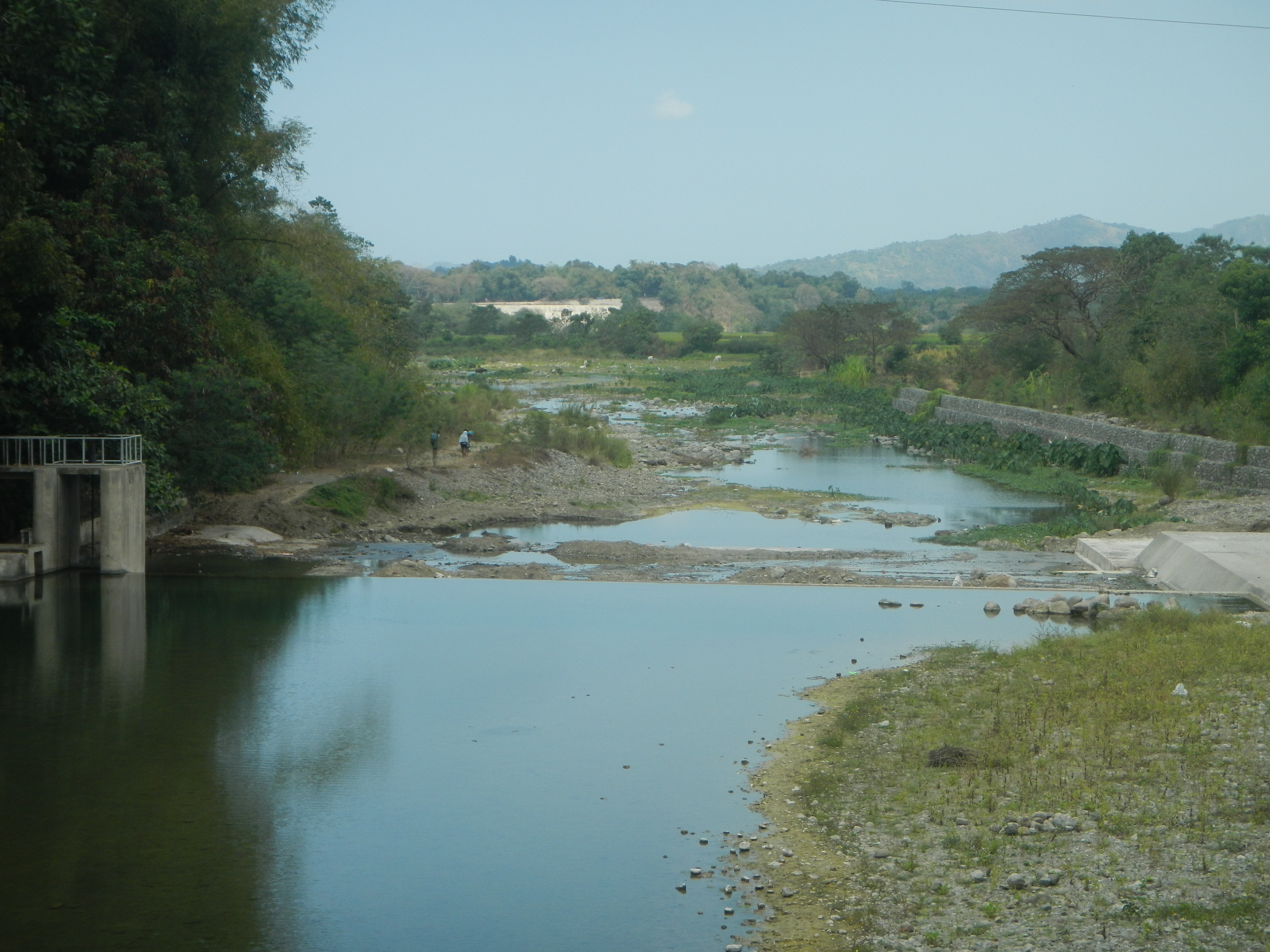
Tapuacan River in Tavora East

The Municipality of Pugo is an inland, landlocked town located at the foot of the Santo Tomas Mountain Range, along the southeastern side of La Union province. It is bordered by Tubao to the north and northwest, Rosario to the south and southeast, and Tuba to the east. Primarily an agricultural town, Pugo is rich in natural resources and scenic landscapes.

Pugo is situated 44.46 kilometres (27.63 mi) from the provincial capital San Fernando, and 225.83 kilometres (140.32 mi) from the country's capital city of Manila.

=== Topography ===
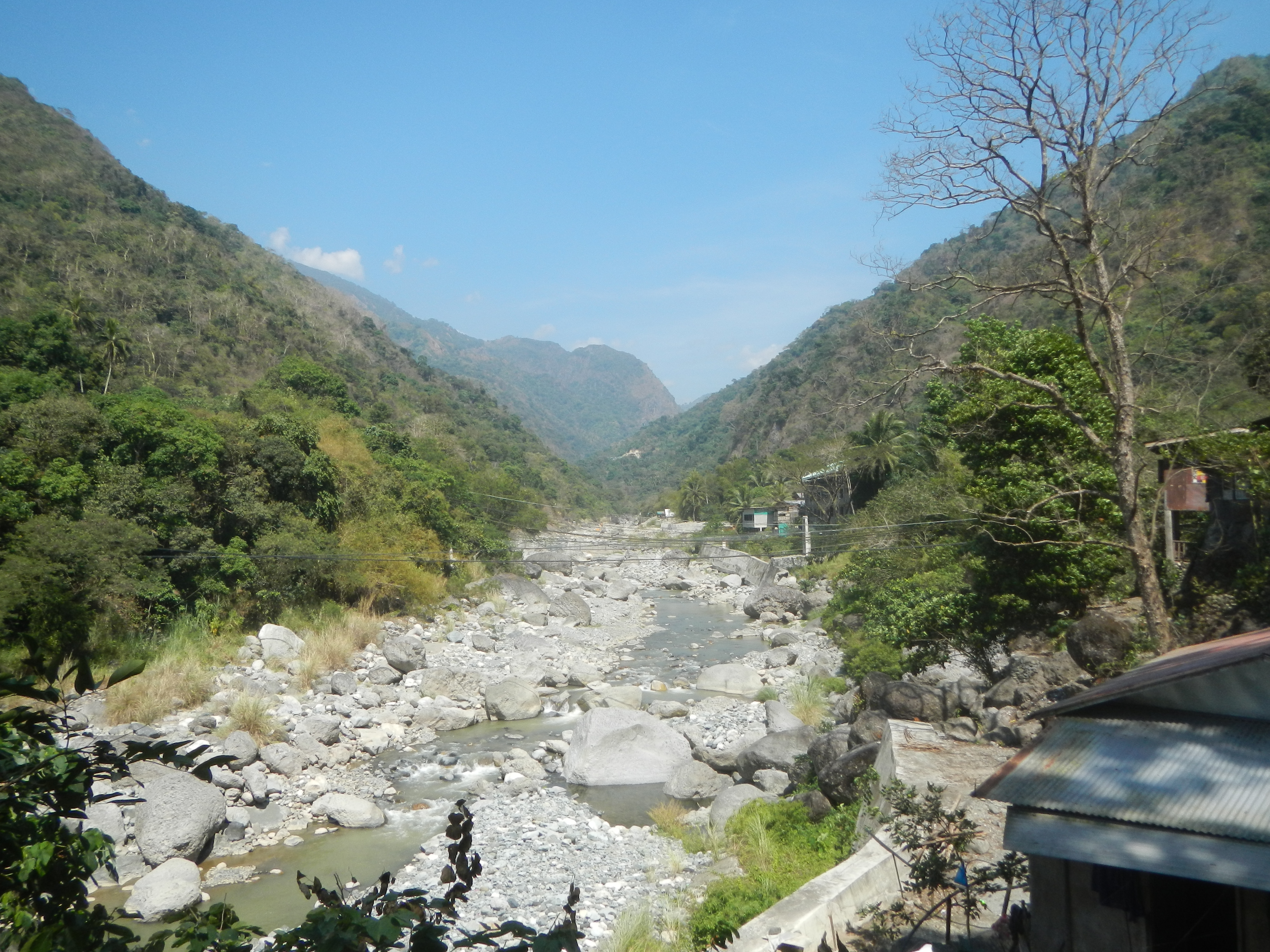
Bued River in Saytan

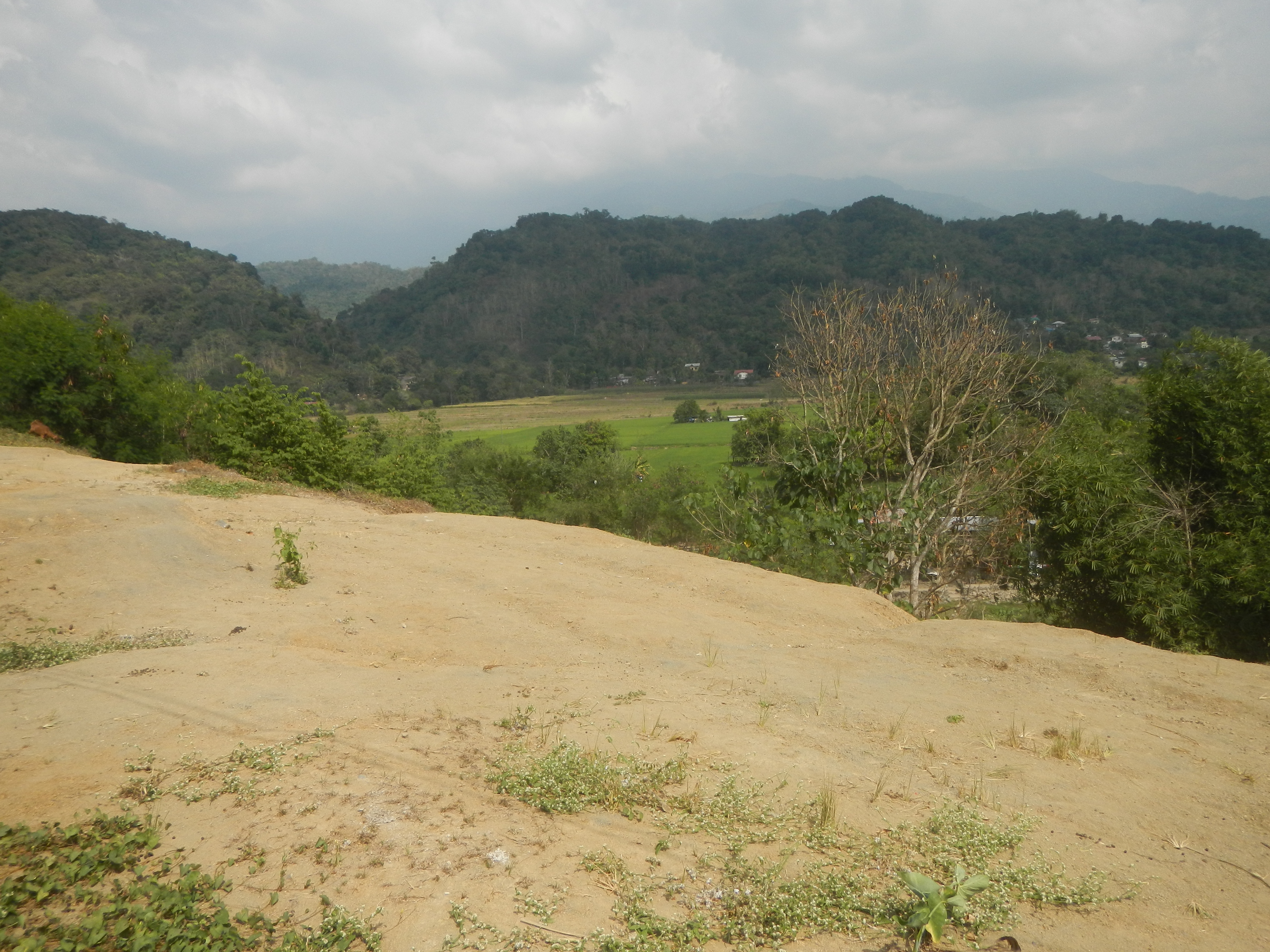
Mountain view in Ambalite

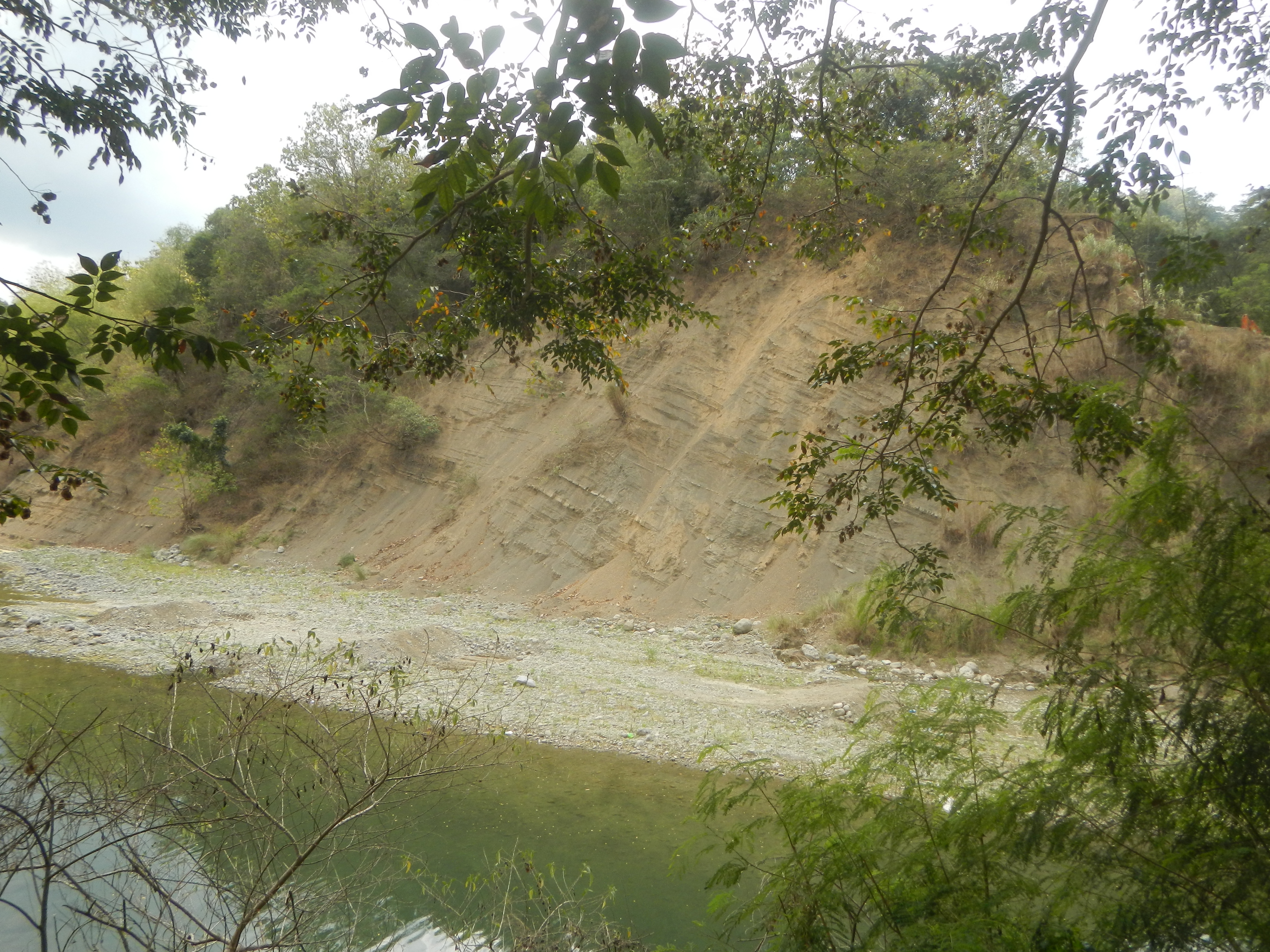
River in Tavora

The town's topography is predominantly hilly and mountainous, as it is nestled at the foothills of the Mount Santo Tomas (Cordillera Central) a stratovolcano. Lush and peaceful forests cover much of the area, with the terrain rising gradually eastward. Rural areas in the town are characterized by alluvial plains. Pugo is traversed by several creeks, natural springs, and rivers, including the Ifugao (Aringay) River, Bued River, Nagbukel River, and Tapuacan River. The Tapuacan River, located in Barangay Cares, is renowned as the cleanest inland river in northern Luzon and the Ilocos Region.

=== Barangays ===
Pugo is politically subdivided into 14 barangays, which include both upland and lowland communities. Each barangay is further divided into smaller administrative units called "puroks," and some have "sitios" as well.

- Ambalite
- Ambangonan
- Cares
- Cuenca
- Duplas
- Maoasoas Norte
- Maoasoas Sur
- Palina
- Poblacion East
- Poblacion West
- San Luis
- Saytan
- Tavora East
- Tavora Proper

=== Climate ===
Pugo experiences a Type I climate as defined by the Köppen Climate Classification, which features a clear division between wet and dry seasons. The wet season typically starts around mid-May and continues until late October, while the dry season lasts from December through early May. Heavy rainfall is brought by the Southwest Monsoon (SWM) during the wet season, whereas the Northeast Monsoon (NEM) leads to drier conditions as it moves over the Cordillera Mountains.

Climate data for Pugo, La Union
Month	Jan	Feb	Mar	Apr	May	Jun	Jul	Aug	Sep	Oct	Nov	Dec	Year
Mean daily maximum °C (°F)	30 (86)	31 (88)	32 (90)	33 (91)	32 (90)	31 (88)	30 (86)	29 (84)	30 (86)	30 (86)	31 (88)	30 (86)	31 (87)
Mean daily minimum °C (°F)	20 (68)	21 (70)	22 (72)	24 (75)	25 (77)	25 (77)	24 (75)	24 (75)	24 (75)	23 (73)	22 (72)	20 (68)	23 (73)
Average precipitation mm (inches)	15 (0.6)	16 (0.6)	24 (0.9)	33 (1.3)	102 (4.0)	121 (4.8)	177 (7.0)	165 (6.5)	144 (5.7)	170 (6.7)	56 (2.2)	23 (0.9)	1,046 (41.2)
Average rainy days	6.3	6.6	9.5	12.8	20.6	23.5	25.4	23.4	23.2	21.4	14.0	8.2	194.9
Source: Meteoblue

== Demographics ==
Population census of Pugo
Year	Pop.	±% p.a.
1918	2,545	—
1939	4,733	+3.00%
1948	3,952	−1.98%
1960	5,484	+2.77%
1970	6,483	+1.69%
1975	7,180	+2.07%
1980	7,780	+1.62%
1990	10,939	+3.47%
1995	12,180	+2.03%
2000	13,442	+2.14%
2007	18,265	+4.32%
2010	16,518	−3.59%
2015	19,690	+3.40%
2020	19,337	−0.38%
2024	19,107	−0.29%
Source: Philippine Statistics Authority

Based on the 2020 Census of Population and Housing, Pugo recorded a total population of 19,337 persons as of May 2020. This figure reflects a decrease of 353 persons compared to the 19,690 persons recorded in the 2015 Census.

The population decreased by an average of 4 persons per year for every 1,000 individuals, resulting in an annual population growth rate (PGR) of -0.38% from 2015 to 2020. In 2020, the household population was 19,333 persons, which was 303 persons lower than the 19,636 household population recorded in 2015.

Among the 14 barangays of Pugo, Cares was the most populous, contributing 14.00% to the municipality's total population. It was followed by Palina with 11.21%, San Luis with 10.57%, Cuenca with 9.31%, and Saytan with 7.35%. The least populated barangay was Duplas, which accounted for 3.60% of the population. Duplas also held the position of least populated barangay in 2015.

=== Sex Ratio and Age Distribution ===
- The sex ratio in 2020 was 104 males per 100 females, a slight decline from 105 males per 100 females in 2015.
- The median age of the population increased to 27.92 years in 2020 from 26.50 years in 2015, indicating a gradually aging population.
- The largest age group in 2020 consisted of children aged 10 to 14 years (9.56% of the population), followed by those aged 5 to 9 years (9.33%) and 15 to 19 years (9.20%).
- Males outnumbered females in age groups 0 to 34 and 40 to 59, while females were more numerous in the 35 to 39 age group and in the 60 years and above age group.

=== Voting Population ===
As of 2022, Pugo registered 12,786 voters, representing 66.75% of its household population in 2020. Among the voting-age population (18 years and over), 50.96% were males, while 49.04% were females.

=== Dependency Ratio ===
The overall dependency ratio in Pugo decreased to 52 dependents for every 100 working-age individuals (15 to 64 years old) in 2020, compared to 53 dependents per 100 working-age individuals in 2015. The 2020 dependency ratio included 42 young dependents (under 15 years old) and 10 elderly dependents (65 years and above).

=== Marital Status ===
Of the total household population aged 10 years and over, the following marital statuses were recorded in 2020:

- Never married: 38.63% (6,114 persons)
- Married: 42.26% (6,689 persons)
- Widowed: 5.12%
- Annulled/Separated: 1.86%
- Common-law/Live-in: 12.11%
- Unknown: 0.02%

Among the never-married population, 54.30% were males, while 45.70% were females.

=== Birth Registration ===
In 2020, 19,215 persons in Pugo had their births registered at the Local Civil Registry Office (LCRO), accounting for 99.39% of the total household population. Of those with registered births, 50.98% were males, and 49.02% were females, resulting in a sex ratio of 104 males per 100 females whose births were registered.

=== Ethnicity and Language ===
The population of Pugo is predominantly Ilocano, with smaller Cordilleran (Igorot) indigenous groups such as the Bago and Ibaloi. Other minority groups include Tagalog and Pangasinan communities. The primary language spoken is Iloco, while Filipino and English are widely used for communication and instruction.

=== Religion ===
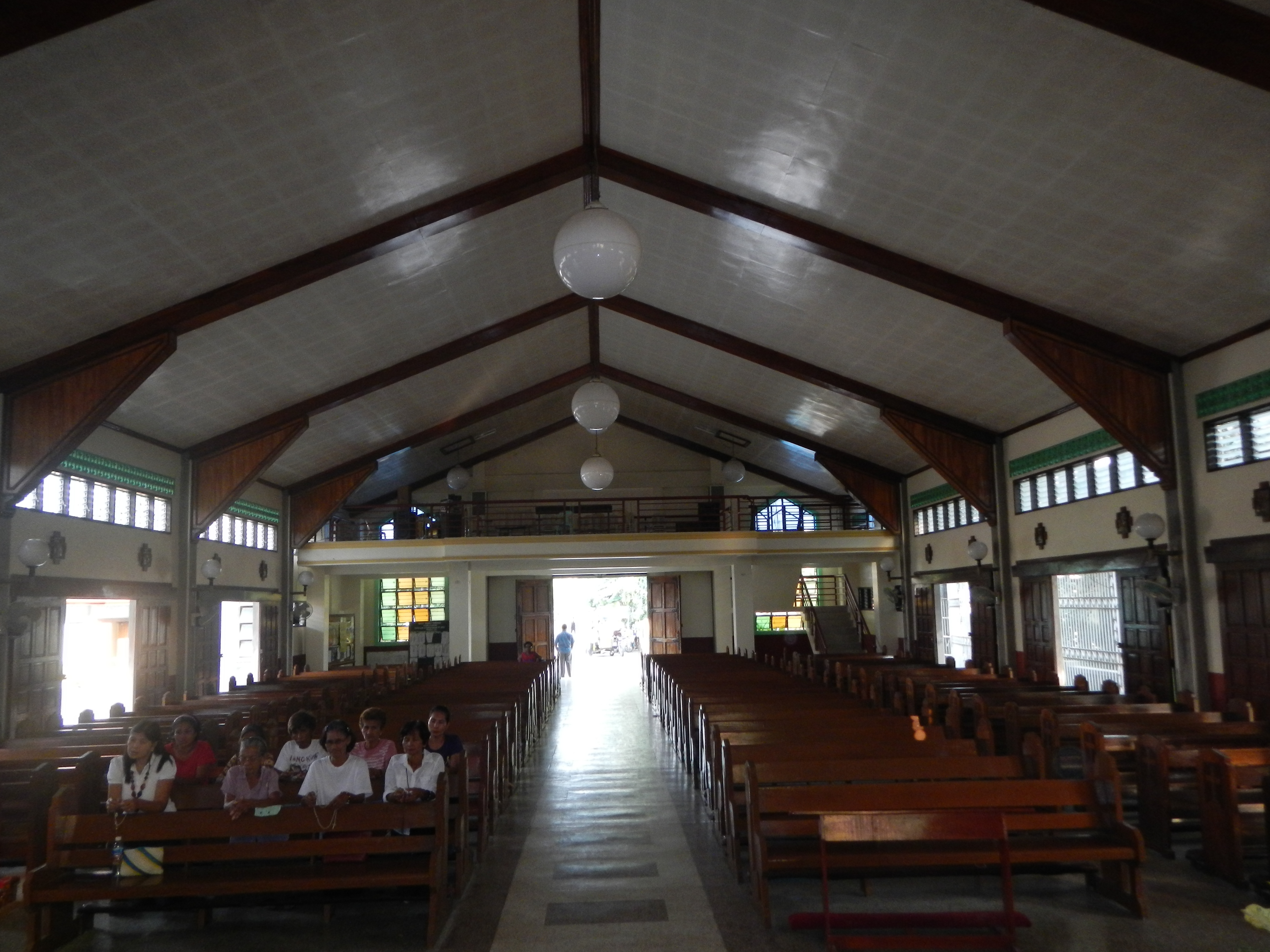
Mass in The Holy Family Parish

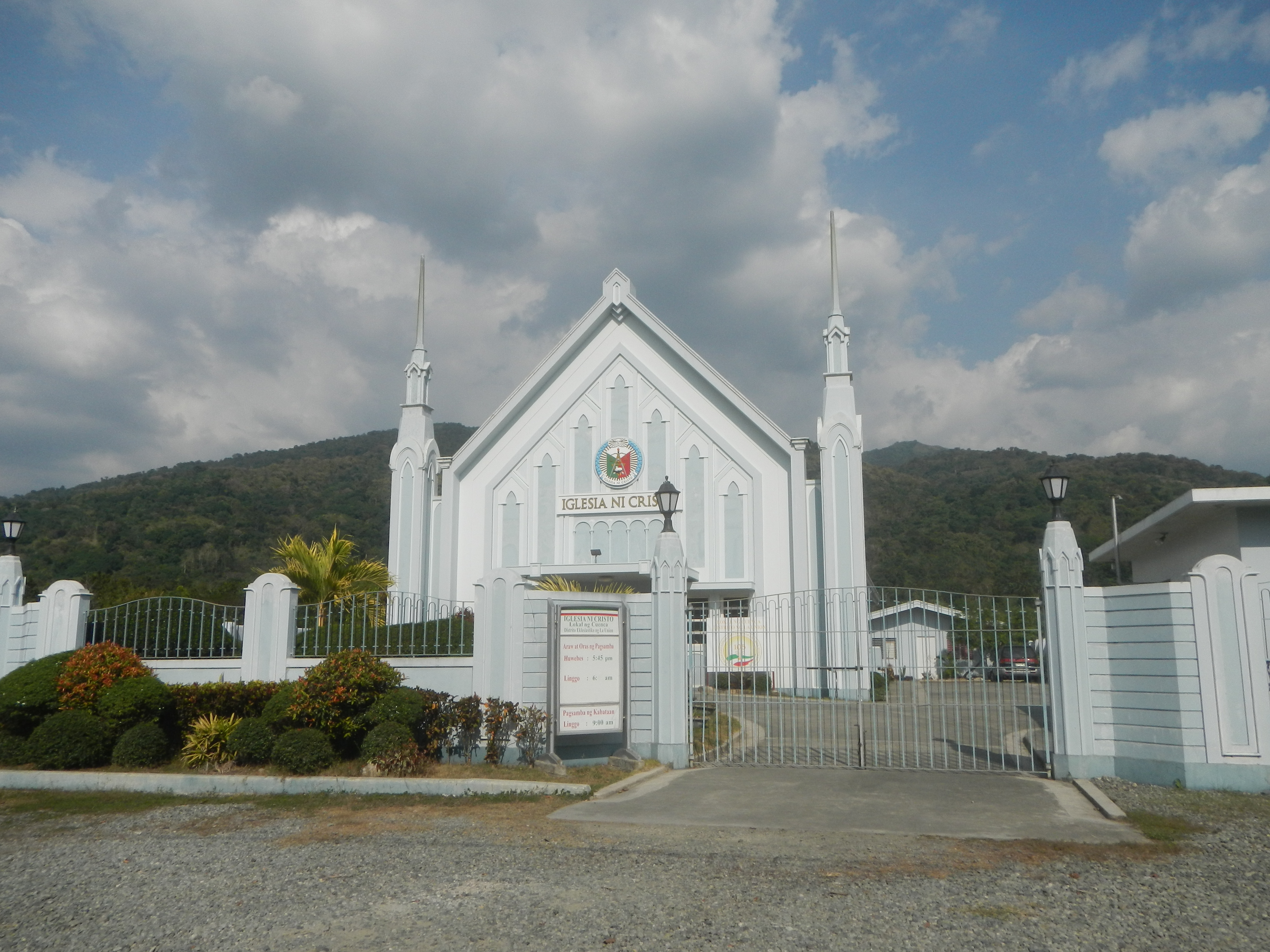
Pugo Iglesia ni Cristo

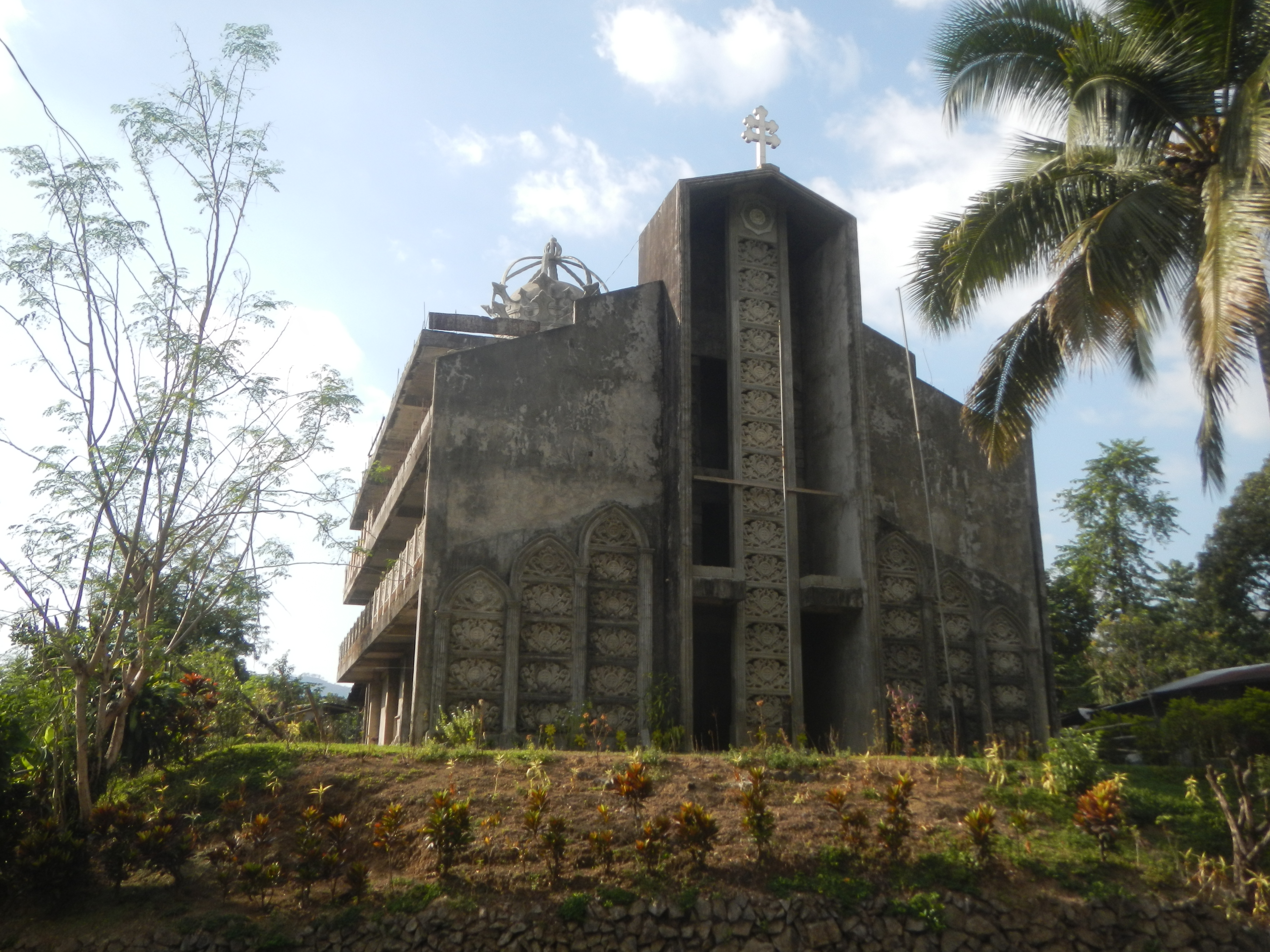
Crusaders Divine Church of Christ in Palina

Pugo is predominantly Roman Catholic, with significant populations adhering to other Christian denominations, including Iglesia ni Cristo, Protestantism, Aglipayan, Pentecostal, and Jehovah’s Witnesses. There are also smaller religious communities practicing Islam and Buddhism.

== Education ==
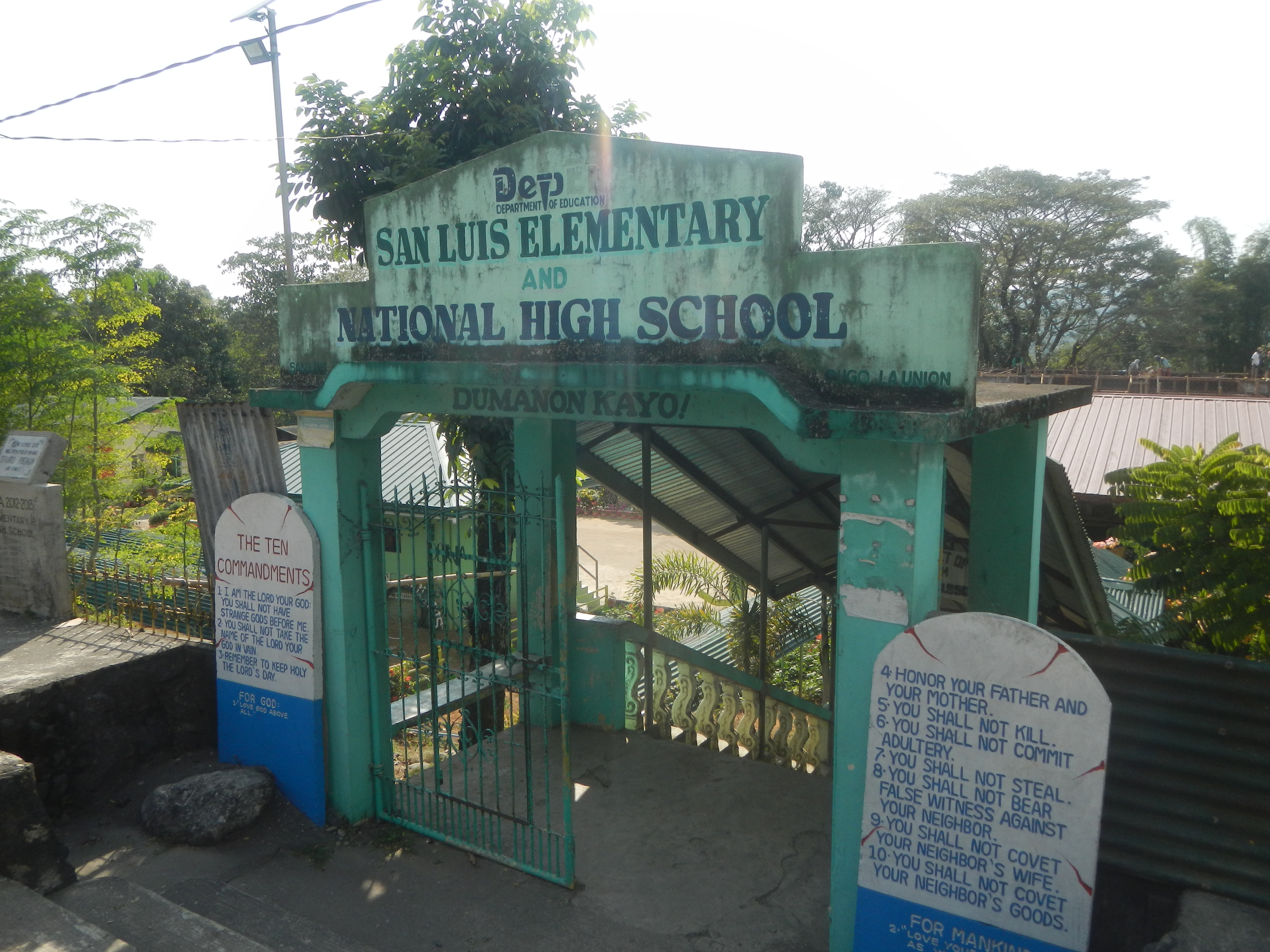
San Luis Elementray / High School

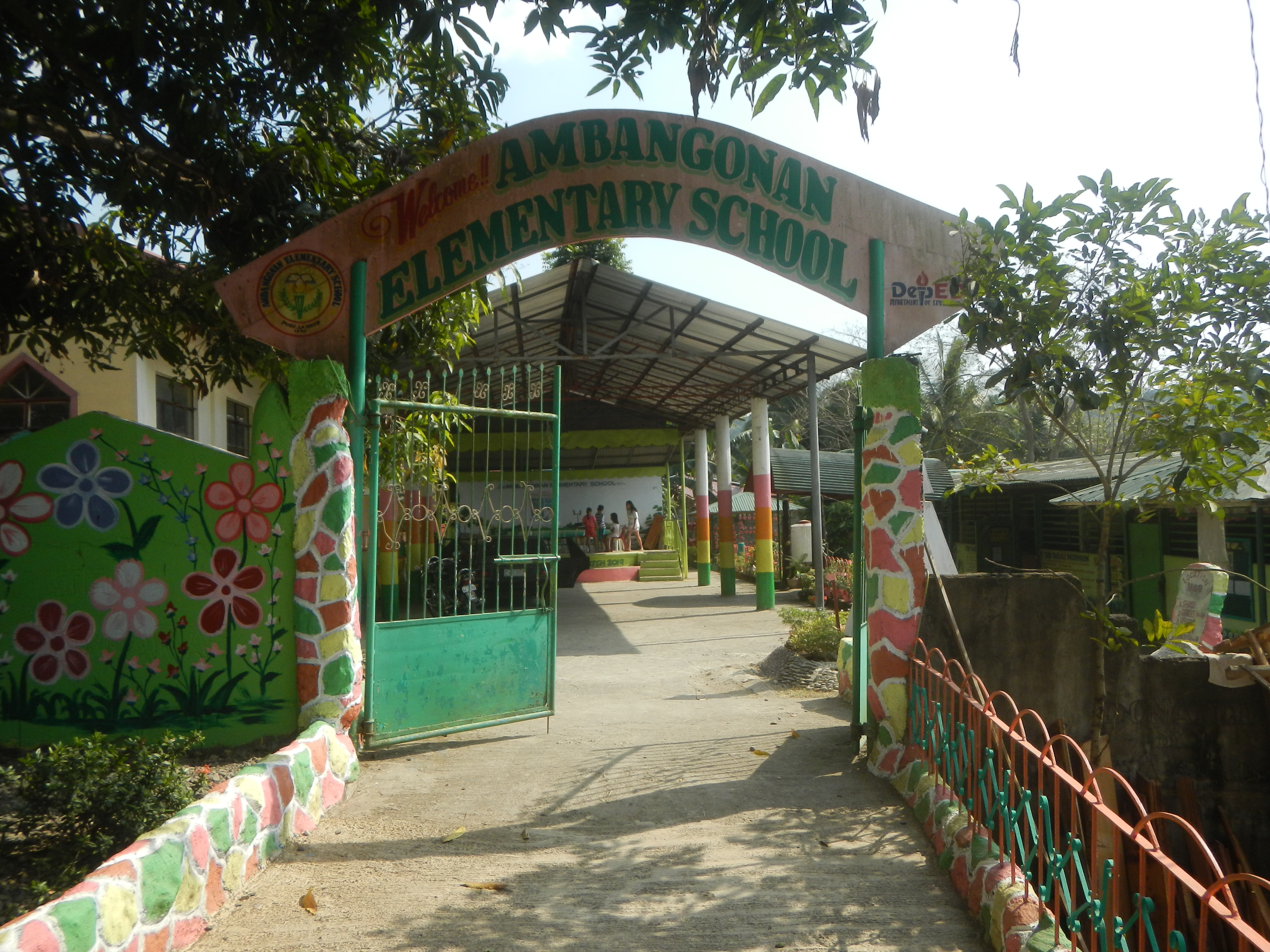
Ambangonan Elementary School

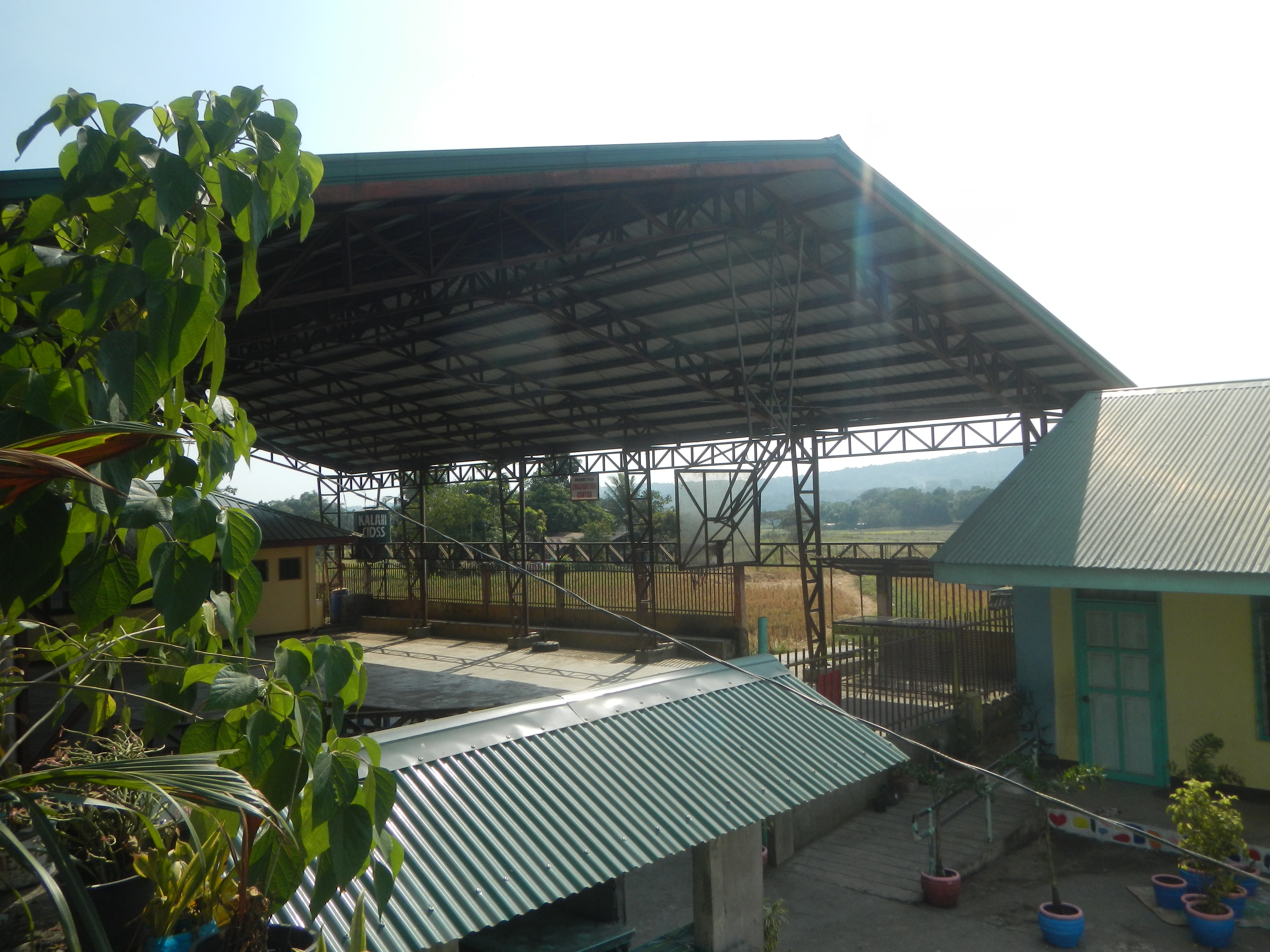
Maoasoas Elementary School

The Pugo Schools District Office governs all educational institutions within the municipality. It oversees the management and operations of all private and public elementary and high schools.

Of the population aged 5 years and over in Pugo, 24.89% attended or completed elementary education, 43.96% completed high school, 10.52% were college undergraduates, and 13.27% were academic degree holders. Among those with academic degrees, 58.03% were females, and 41.97% were males. Similarly, more females (70.00%) than males (30.00%) pursued post-baccalaureate courses.

The municipality posted a literacy rate of 98.60%, with males slightly more literate (50.95%) than females (49.05%).

Pugo has 11 public elementary schools and 5 public secondary schools, which provide accessible education to its residents.

=== Primary and elementary schools ===
- Ambalite Elementary School
- Ambangonan Elementary School
- Cuenca Elementary School
- Maoasoas Elementary School
- Maoasoas Elementary School - Annex
- Palina Elementary School
- Palina Elementary School - Annex
- Pugo Central School
- San Luis Elementary School
- Tavora Elementary School
- UCCP Nursery Kindergarten

=== Secondary schools ===
- Cuenca National High School
- La Union Special School for Culture and Arts
- Maoasoas National High School
- Pugo Central National High School
- San Luis National High School
- Saytan Integrated School

== Economy ==
Pugo is a fifth-class income municipality in La Union, with a poverty incidence of 10.03%. In 2020, the municipality recorded a revenue of ₱110.2 million, assets of ₱449.1 million, expenditure of ₱74.32 million, and liabilities of ₱56.23 million. The town is steadily progressing by relying on agriculture, cottage industries, and services, while also embracing its potential as a gateway to eco-tourism and trade.

Poverty incidence of Pugo (%)

Source: Philippine Statistics Authority

=== Agriculture ===
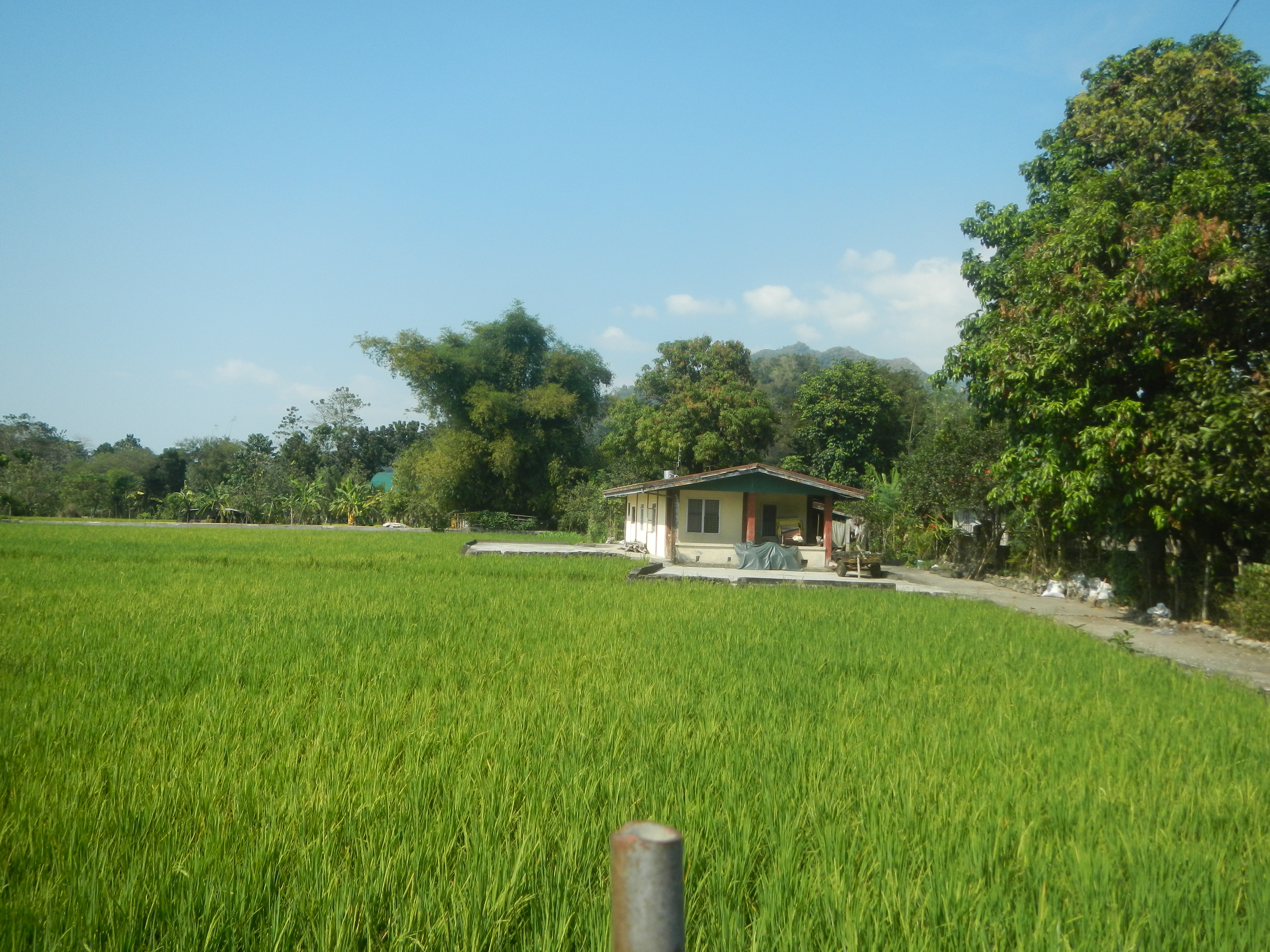
Paddy fields in Cares

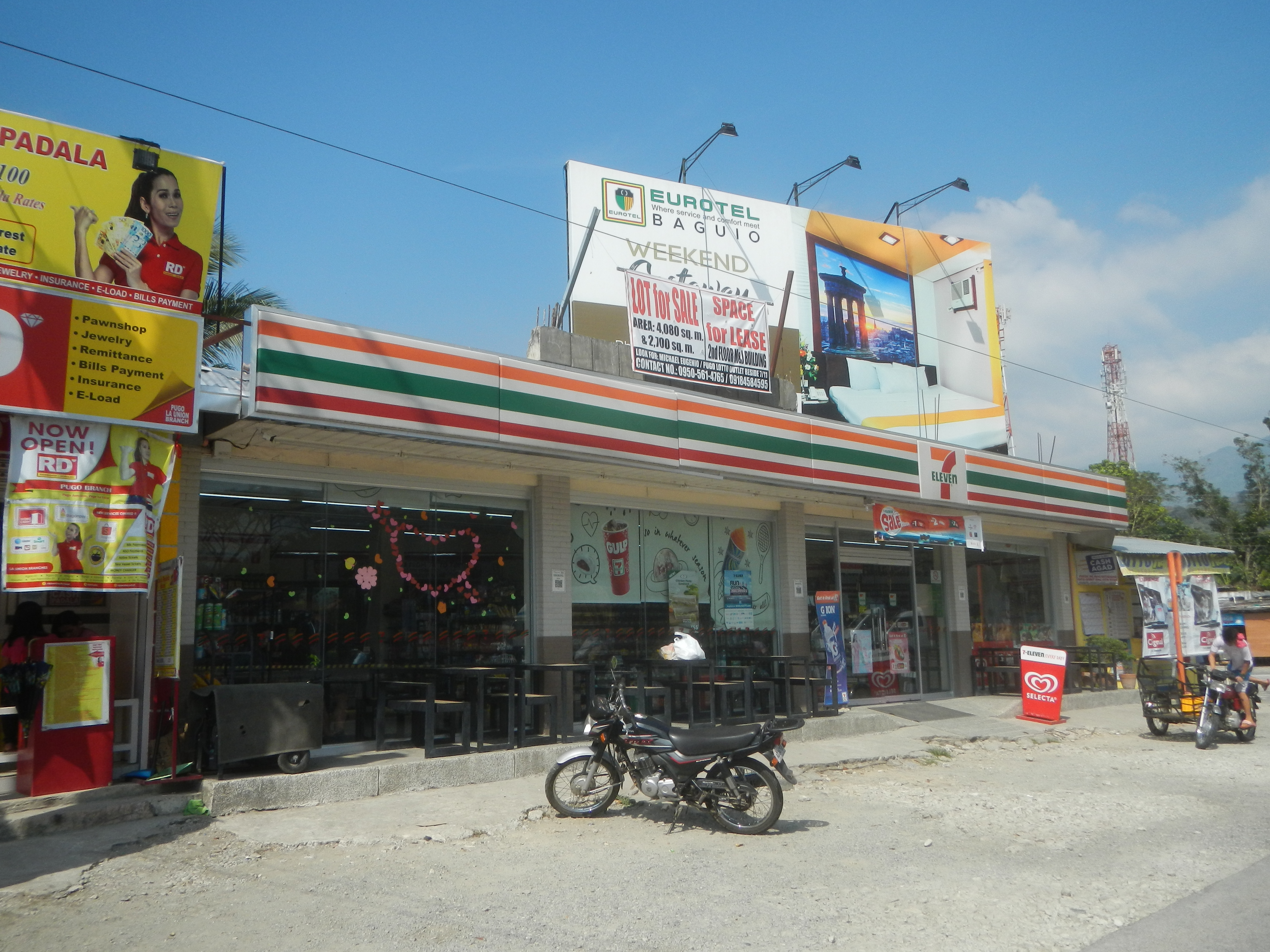
Business establishments in Poblacion West

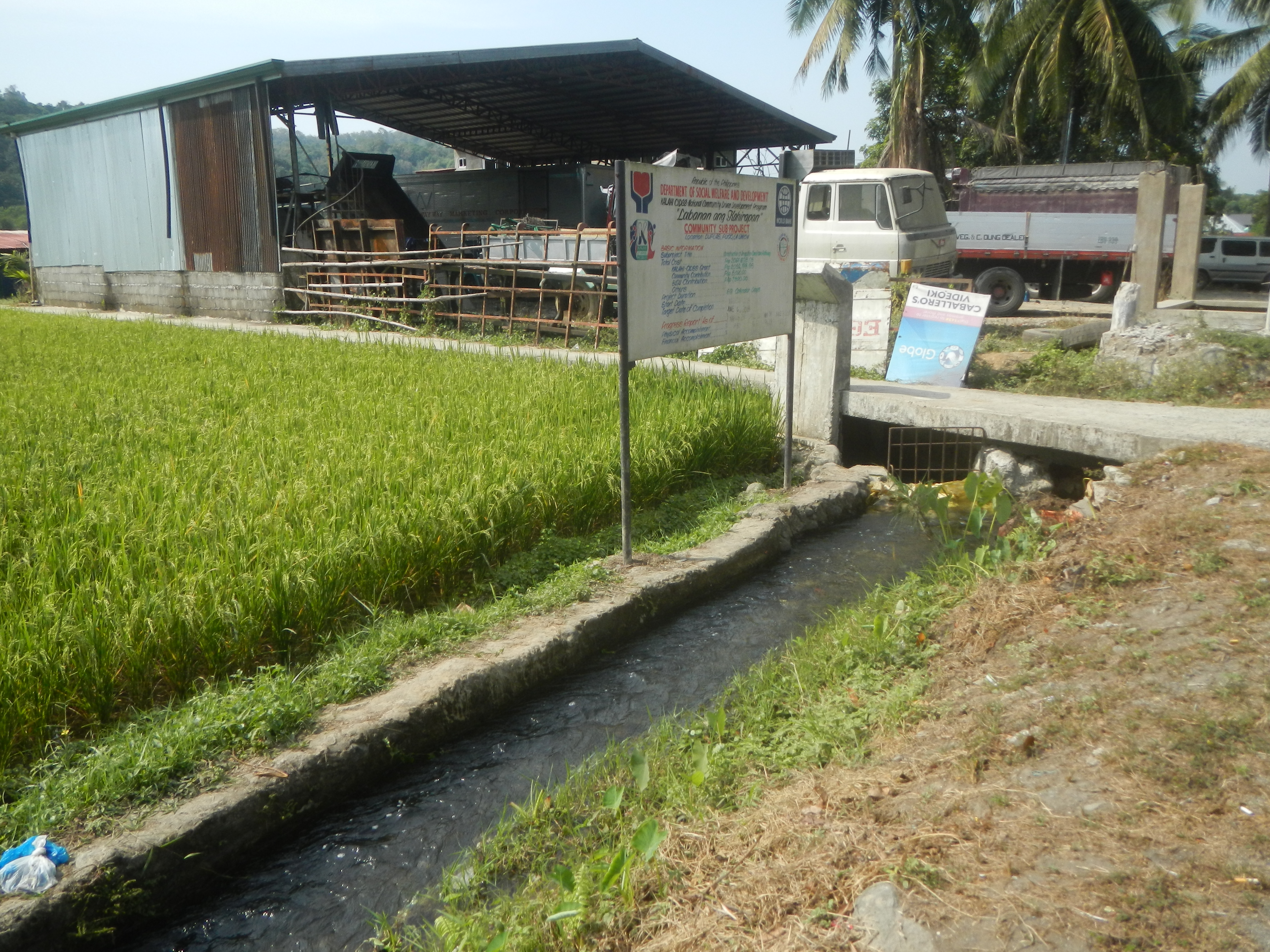
irrigation canal in Duplas

Pugo is widely recognized for its agricultural products, particularly rice, corn, tobacco, root crops, fruits, and vegetables. Agriculture remains the backbone of the local economy, with limited tracts of fertile land dedicated to crop production. Farmers in the area also practice diverse farming techniques to maintain sustainability and ensure a steady supply of produce for both local consumption and regional markets.

=== Livestock and Poultry ===
Livestock farming is a significant part of Pugo’s economy, where residents engage in raising various animals such as poultry, particularly quail eggs and meat, along with cattle, swine, carabao, and goats. The presence of small-scale livestock farms supports the local supply of meat, local dairy products, and other animal-based goods. The town’s livestock sector also plays a critical role in providing employment opportunities and contributing to local trade and commerce.

=== Industries ===
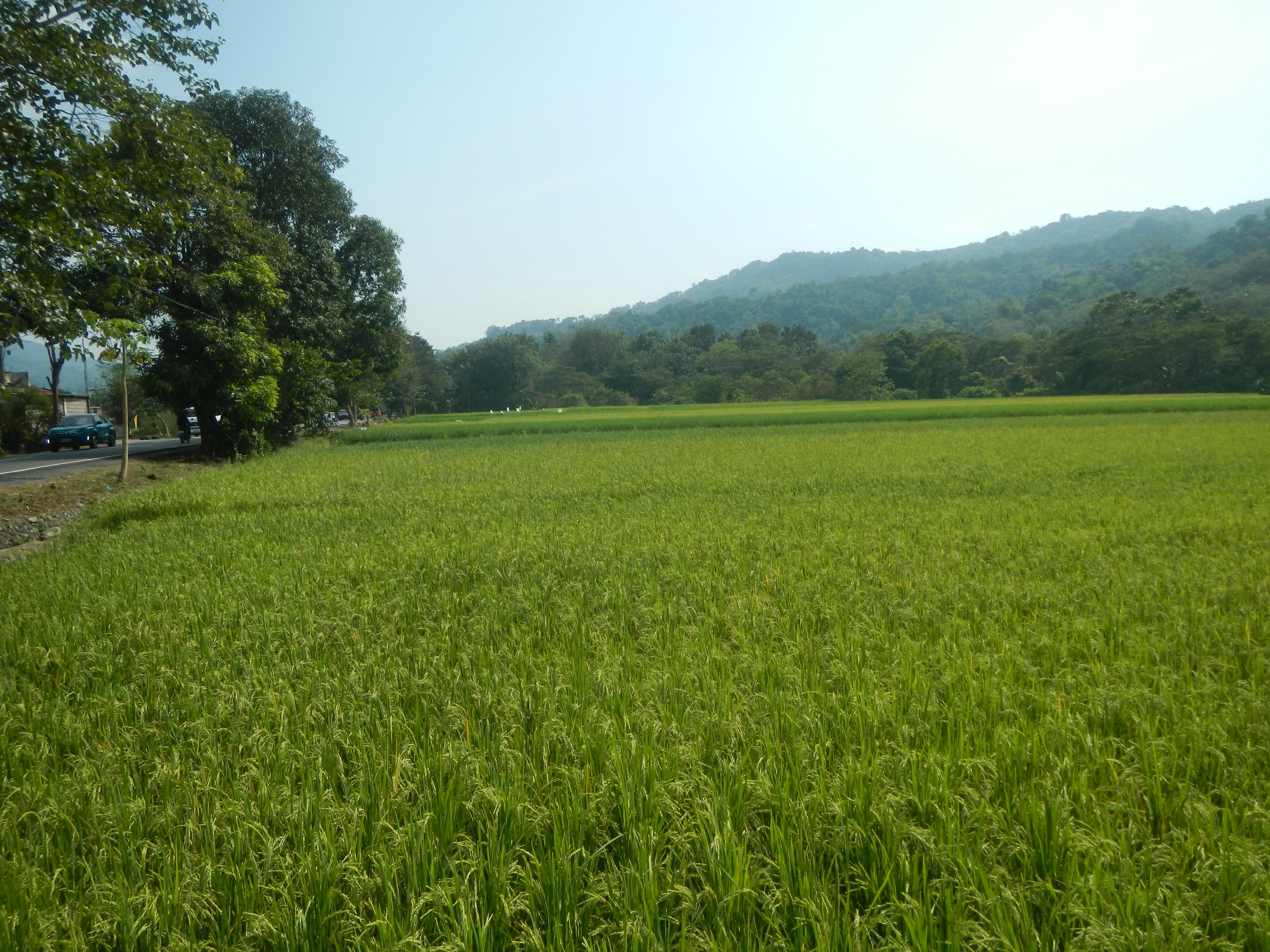
Paddy fields in Ambalite

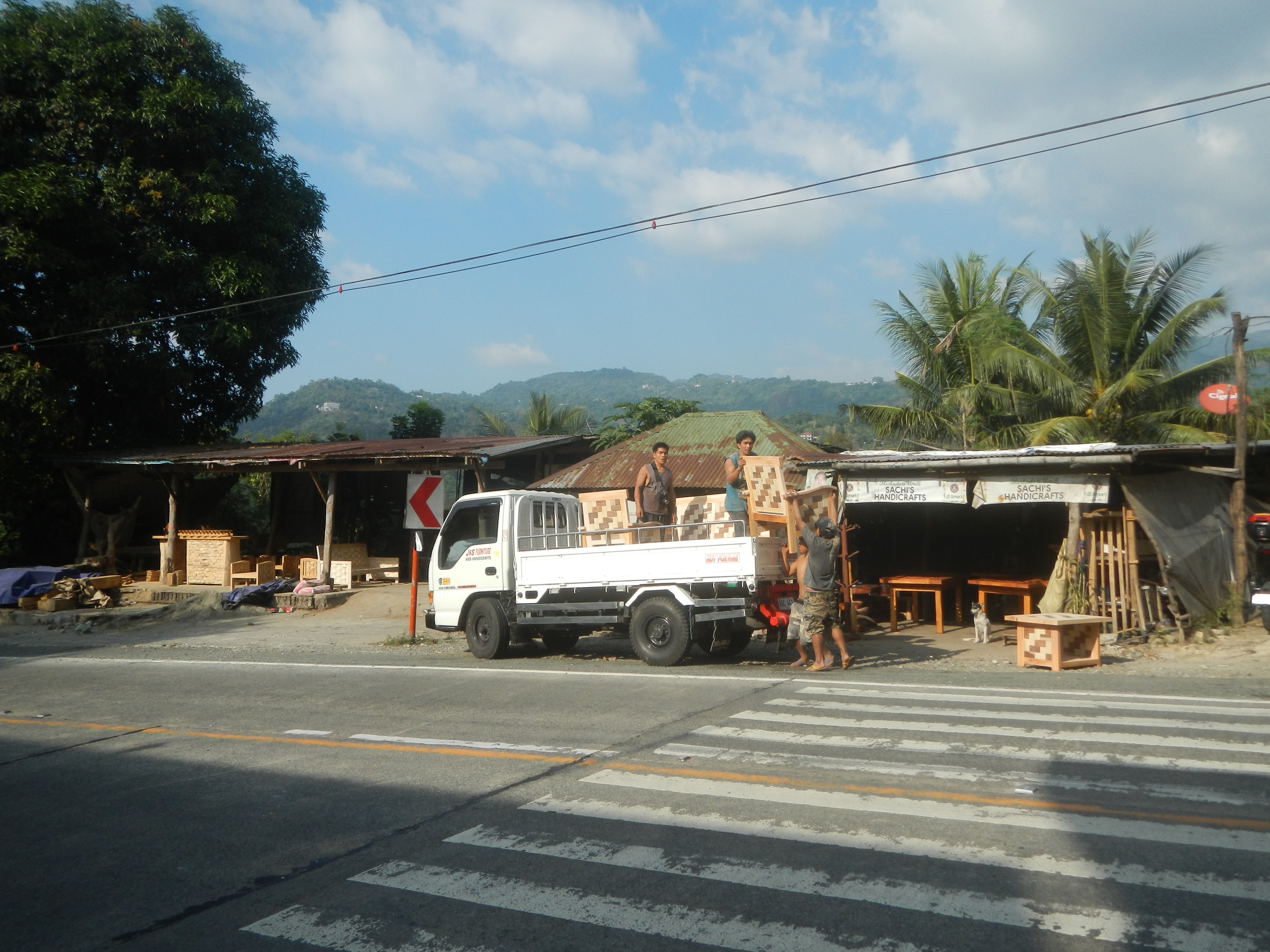
Wood furnishing products in Tabaan Norte

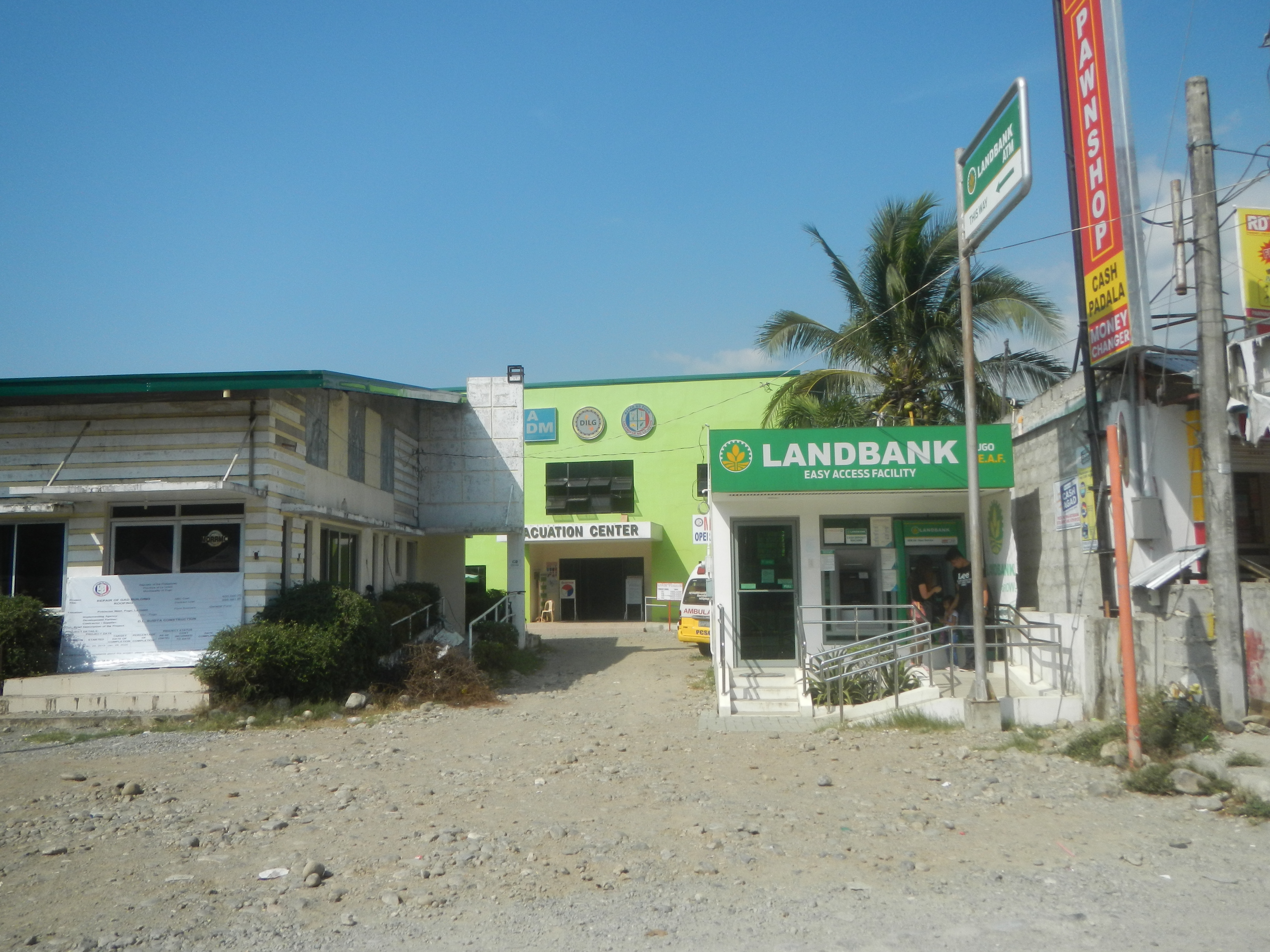
Local Bank in Poblacion west

The town is renowned for its woodcarving industry, which produces high-quality furnishing products such as chairs, tables, cabinets, and home decor. This craft reflects the town’s long-standing tradition of woodworking, which has been passed down through generations. Additionally, basketry and the making of other woven products from bamboo also thrive in Pugo, where skilled artisans craft various items like baskets, bags, and mats. These industries not only contribute to the local economy but also attract interest from visitors and buyers from outside the region.

=== Small-Scale Businesses ===
Pugo’s economy is further supported by a range of small-scale businesses in the town proper, including retail stores, trading establishments, and a growing number of micro, small, and medium enterprises (MSMEs). These businesses offer essential products and services to both residents and tourists, enhancing the town’s economic vitality. Many of these small businesses are family-owned and help stimulate employment, providing a steady income stream for local households..

=== Tourism ===
Pugo is also embracing its tourism potential with a focus on agri-tourism and eco-tourism. The town is home to notable tourist spots such as Tapuacan River, Kukukob Falls, and Sangbay Falls, which attract visitors seeking to experience nature and local agricultural practices. These attractions offer opportunities for sustainable tourism that benefit the local economy while preserving the environment.

== Government ==
=== Local government ===
Just as the national government, the municipal government of Pugo is divided into three branches: executive, legislative, and judiciary. The judicial branch is administered solely by the Supreme Court of the Philippines. The LGUs have control of the executive and legislative branches.

The executive branch is composed of the mayor and the barangay captain for the barangays.Local Government Code of the Philippines, Book III, Department of the Interior and Local Government official website.

The legislative branch is composed of the Sangguniang Bayan (town assembly), Sangguniang Barangay (barangay council), and the Sangguniang Kabataan for the youth sector.

The seat of Government is vested upon the Mayor and other elected officers who hold office at the Pugo Town Hall. The Sangguniang Bayan is the center of legislation, stationed in Pugo Legislative Building.

=== Elected officials ===
Members of the Municipal Council (2019–2022)
Position	Name
Congressman	Sandra Y. Eriguel
Mayor	Priscilla M. Martin
Vice-Mayor	Jose B. Basallo
Councilors	Mixico V. Dulay
Councilors	Michelle R. Boadilla-Lales
Councilors	Winston C. Boado
Councilors	Rex A. Fernandez
Councilors	Juvenal R. Basallo
Councilors	Bryan T. Balloguing
Councilors	Armand H. Malamion
Councilors	Rogelio E. Labayo

== Tourism ==
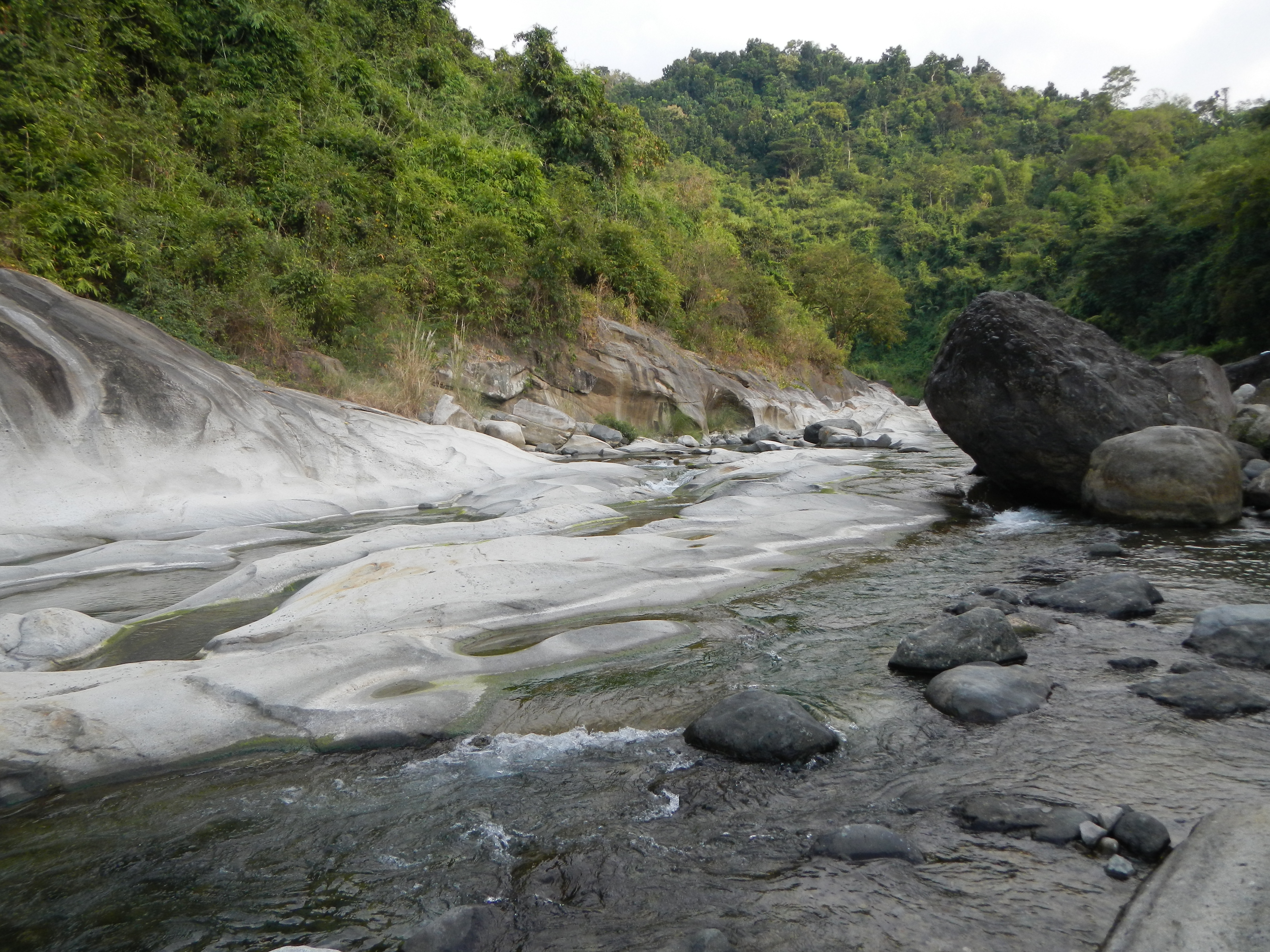
Tapuakan River

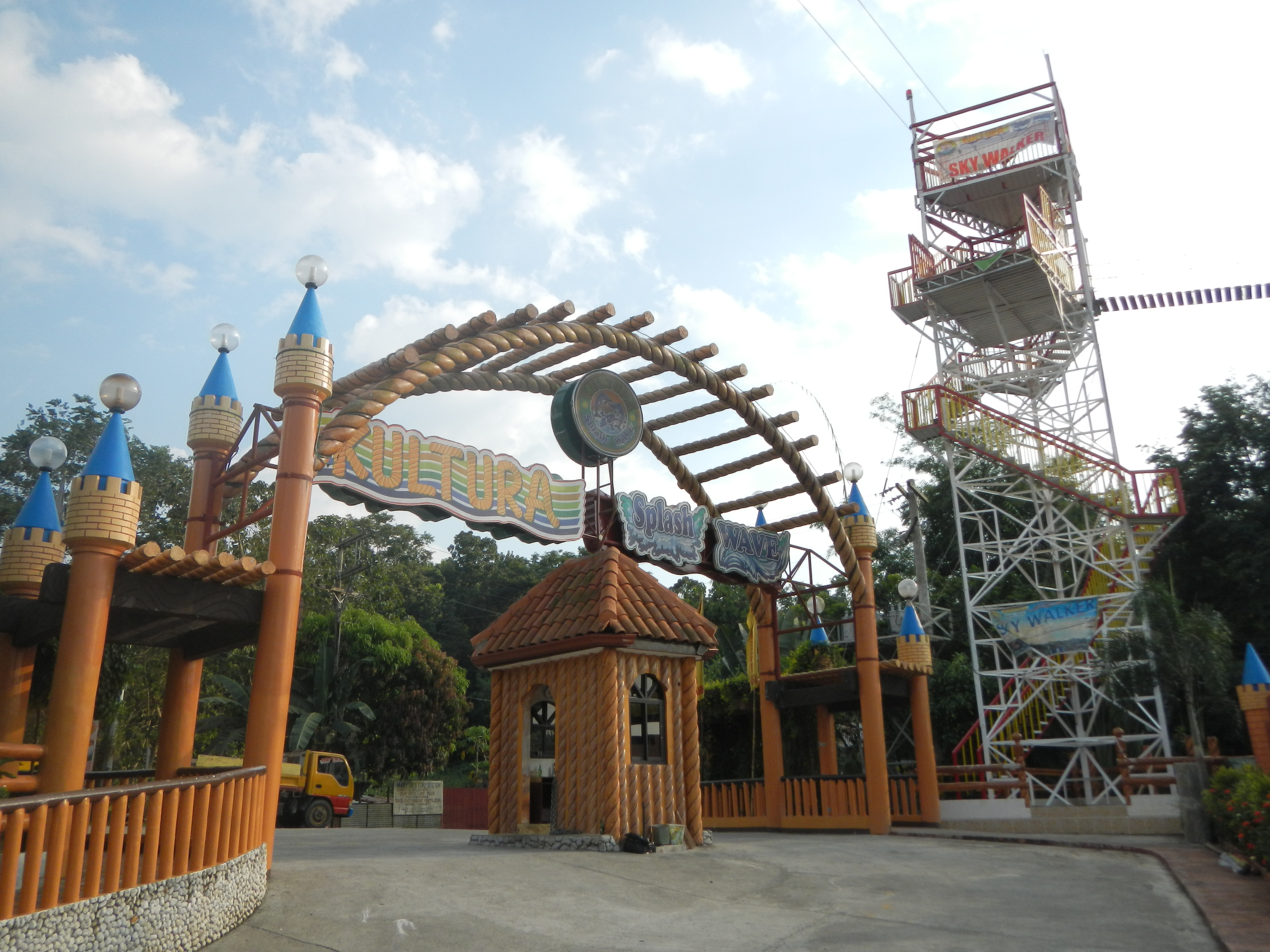
Kultura Splash Wave

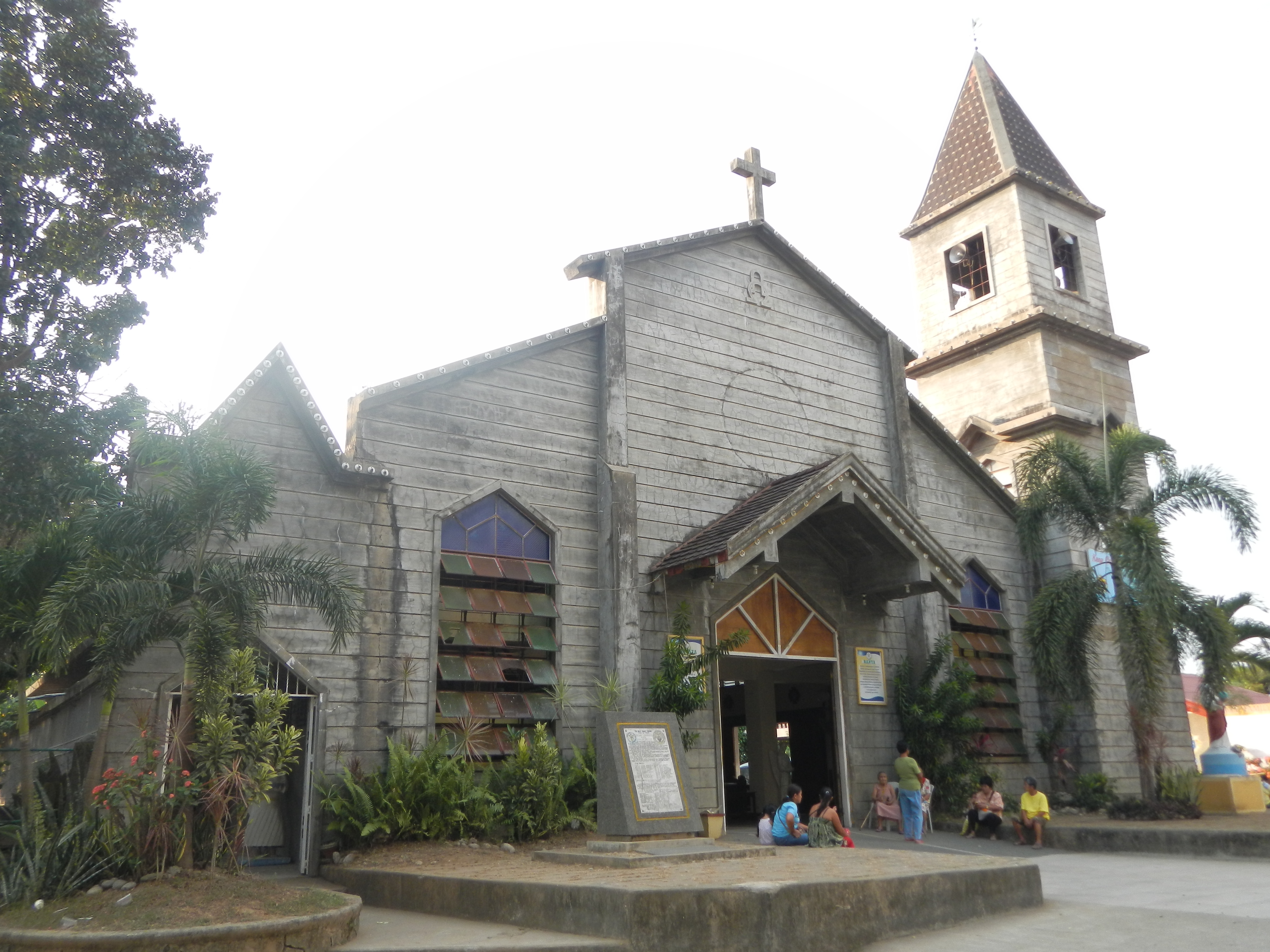
Holy Family Parish Church

Pugo promotes itself as the "Eco-adventure Destination of La Union", with attractions such as PUGAD (Pugo Adventure) and Kultura Splash Wave along Marcos Highway.

=== Nature and Man Made Adventure ===
The park offers a variety of activities and attractions for visitors, including three zip lines, highlighted by its famous 380-meter-long, 200-foot-high Superman Zip Line 1. Other attractions include swimming pools, cottages, conference halls, a hanging bridge, a clean river, a rappelling area, wall climbing, rope activities, ATV rides, a paintball area, trekking trails, and scenic views of the waterfalls.

10 minutes away from Pugad Pugo Adventure is the "Travellers Inn". It offers villas, rooms, and even water adventure parks.

Scenic spots in Pugo include Tapuakan Resort, the Nagbukel, and the hot springs of Cares. Tapuakan Resort features rest areas where the people can enjoy the natural slides of the river. It was recently awarded as the clearest inland body of water for 2008 making it for 2 consecutive years. It also has a hot spring where tourists and the Pugonians go often as they believe that the spring can heal certain skin and pulmonary diseases. Nagbukel is found at Barangay Ambangonan, and many people also go there despite its remote location.

=== PUGAD ===
PUGAD (bird's nest) is one of the recreation and adventure landmarks in Pugo. It is a picturesque site with 3 hectares of green forests, lush mountains, and a clean river. It is 300 meters away from Marcos Highway.

- Zip Line Adventure - Pugo's Pugad has the longest zip line (380 meters) in Luzon, the second in the Philippines.

=== Tapuacan River ===
Tapuacan River (also known as Pugo - Cleanest Inland River of the North, Region I) is located in Barangay Cares (the smallest/inlet town which is situated at the foot of the Santo Tomas mountains range and about an hour away from Baguio passing through the Aspiras, formerly Marcos Highway leading to the Ilocandia Region). The natural scenery is also a 1-hour ride from San Fernando City and around 4–5 hours drive from Manila.

=== Kultura Splash Wave ===
Pugo's Kultura Splash Wave is a prime resort (Km. 21 Marcos Highway, Barangay Cares). It has attractions: Lap pool, Pool Kiddie, Dolphin pools, 4 Giant Slides with Dropzone, Water Factory, Aerial Zip Lines, Wall Climbing, Sky Walker.

=== Marcos Bust ===
A 30 m (98 ft) concrete Bust of Ferdinand Marcos built from 1978 to 1980 using government funds. The monument was controversial as the land used were grabbed from the indigenous Ibaloi people, who were against the Marcos conjugal dictatorship. The monument was built upon the orders of then incumbent President Ferdinand Marcos in a park that he named after himself. The park's land was also land-grabbed from the Ibaloi people. The monument was destroyed in December 2002 by treasure hunters. The destroyed bust is considered "a monument to evil, warning people never to become what this man was" for the future.

=== Holy Family Parish Church ===
As of 2012, the 1909 Holy Family Parish Church of Pugo (canonically erected in 1909), celebrates its fiesta every Last Sunday of December. It is under the jurisdiction of the Diocese of San Fernando de La Union (Dioecesis Ferdinandopolitana ab Unione, Suffragan of Lingayen – Dagupan, which was created on January 19, 1970, and erected on April 11, 1970, comprising the Civil Province of La Union, under the Titular, St. William the Hermit, February 10). The heritage church is under a diocese of the Latin Catholic Church in the Philippines from the Archdiocese of Nueva Segovia. Its Parish Priest is Fr. Crispin N. Reyes.

The Pugo Church is under the Vicariate of St. Francis Xavier with Vicar Forane, Fr. Joel Angelo Licos. The Holy Family Parish was built in the year 1909-1911 by the Belgian Missionary for the people of Pugo, La Union.

== Gallery ==
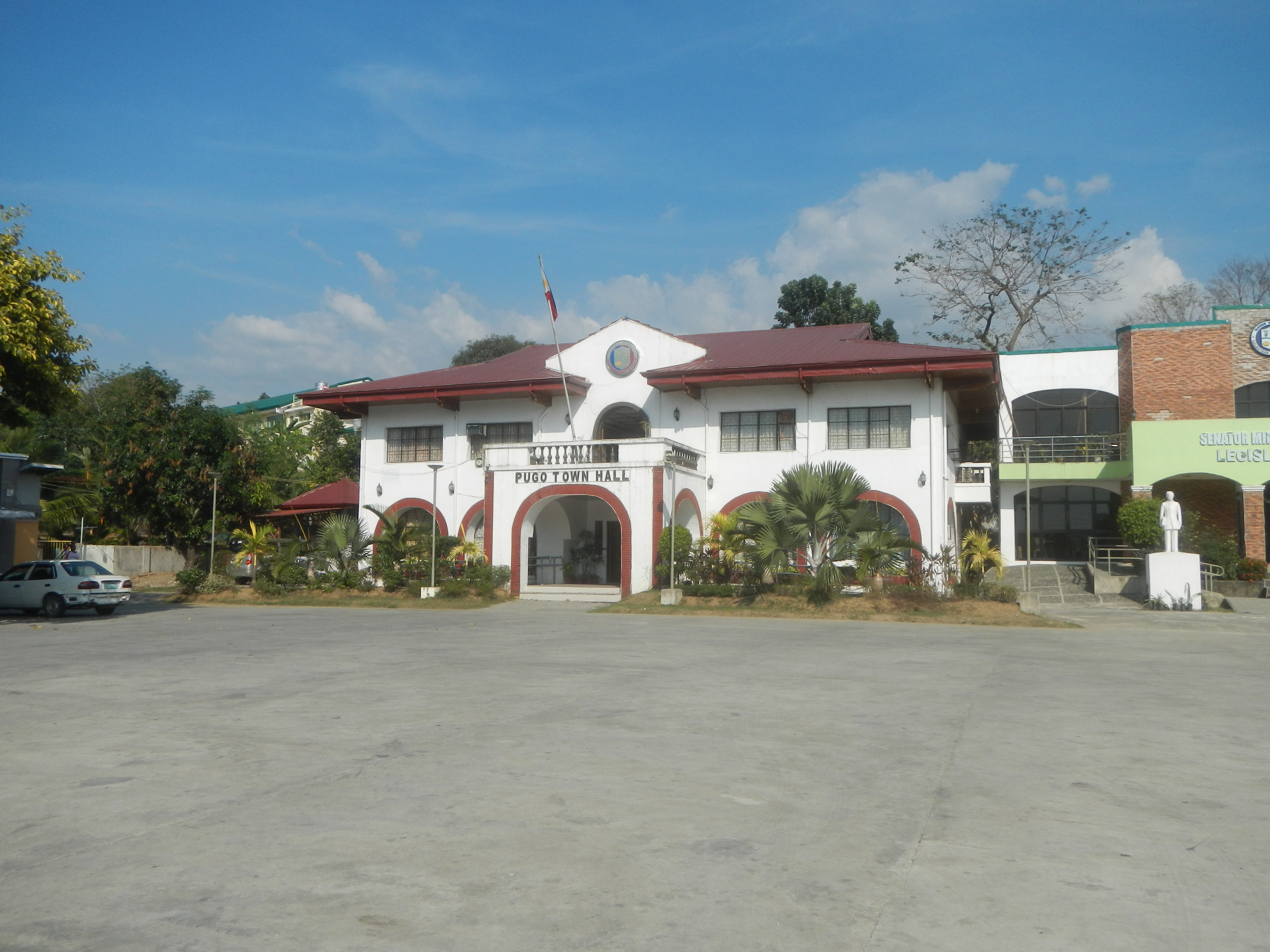
Municipal Hall

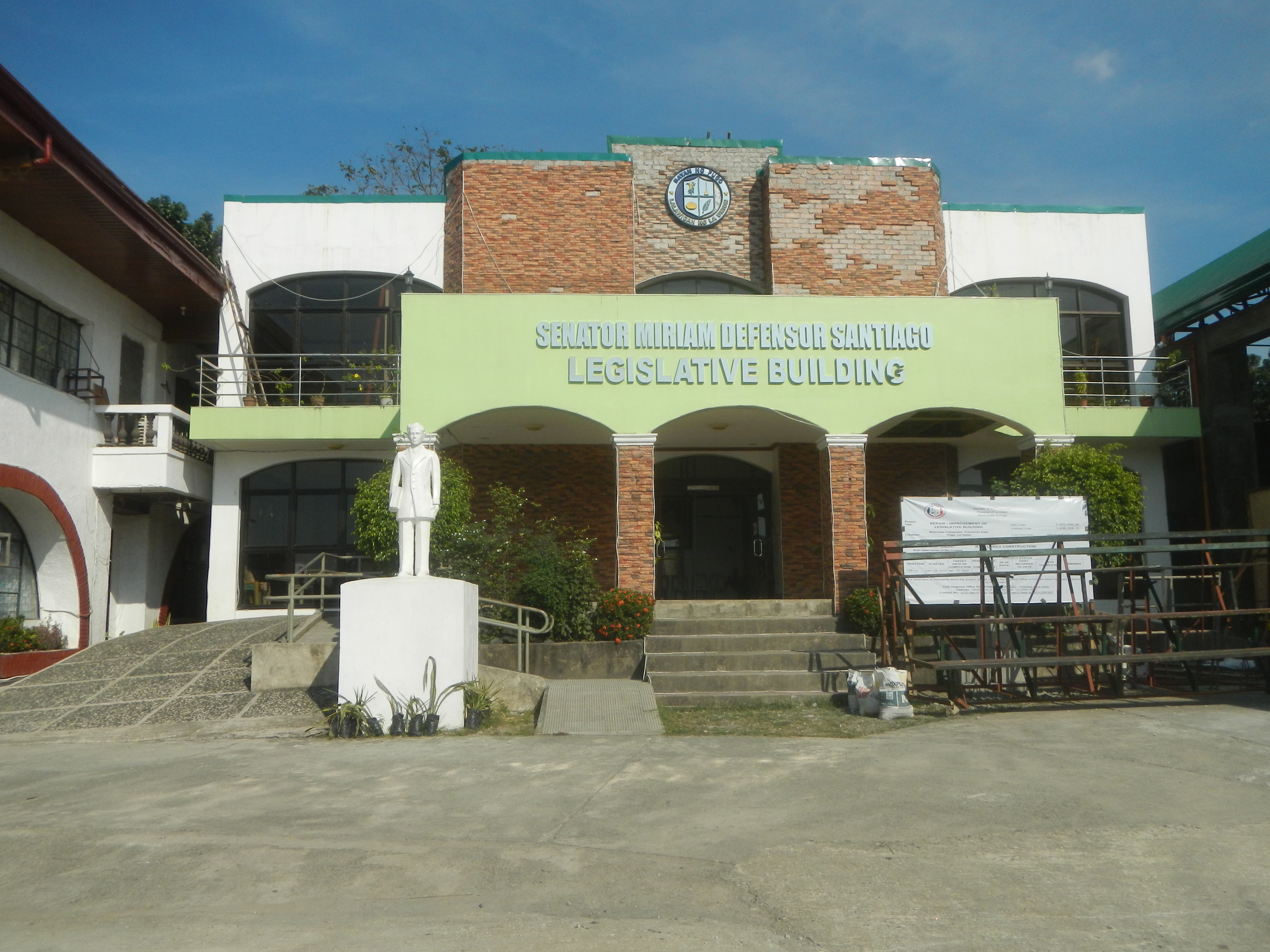
Pugo Legislative Building

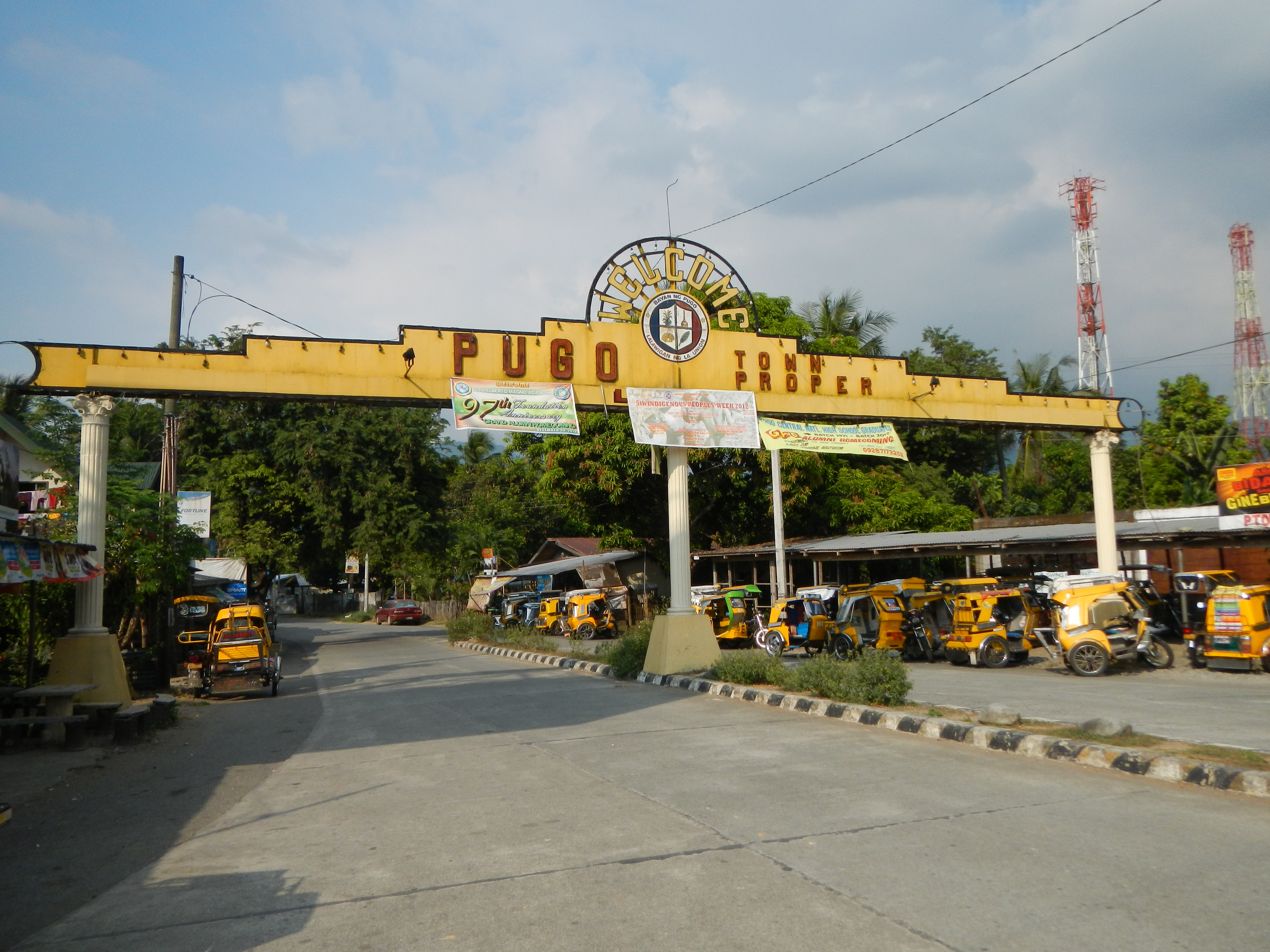
Town center and welcome arch

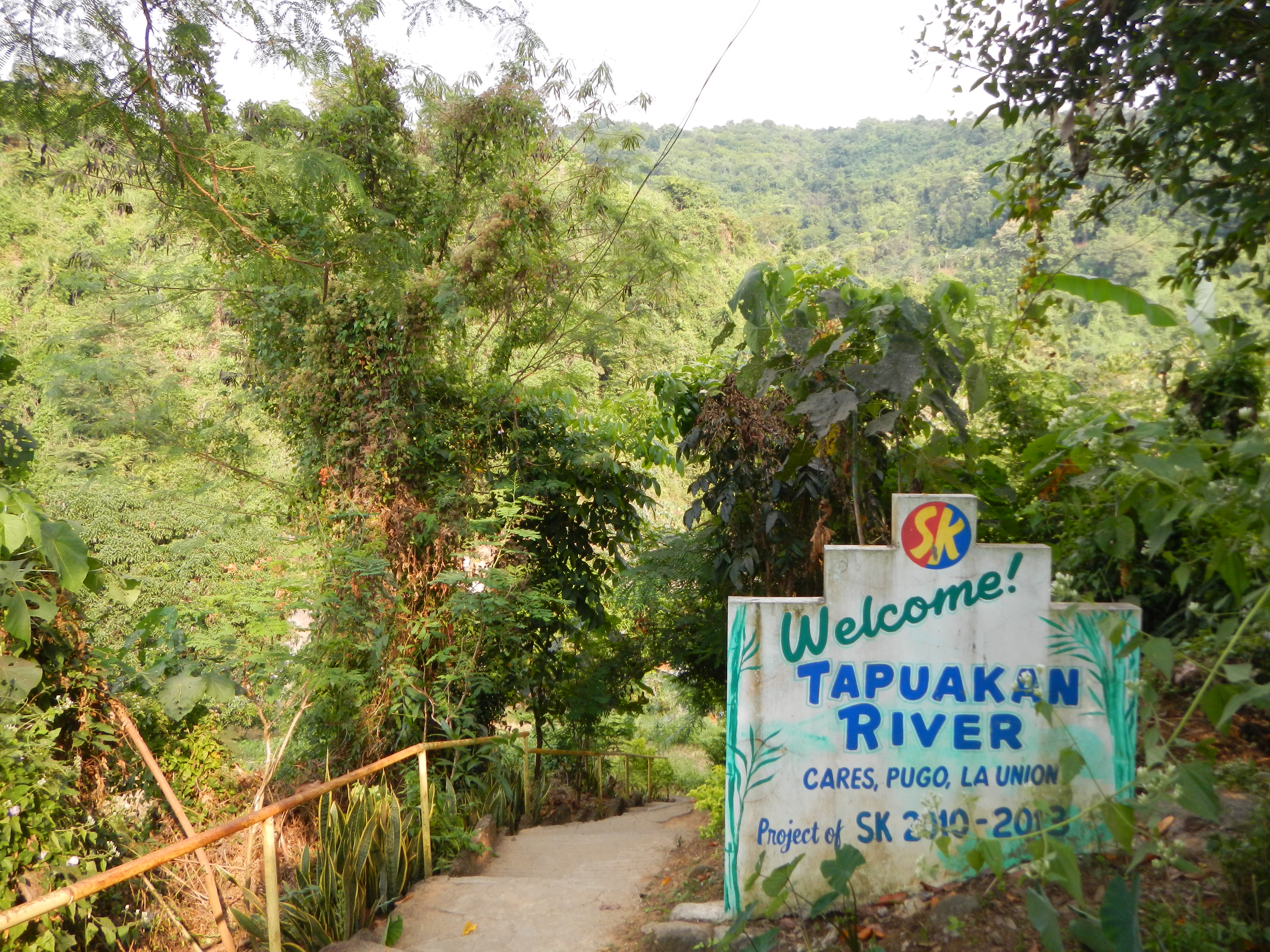
Pugo rural landscape

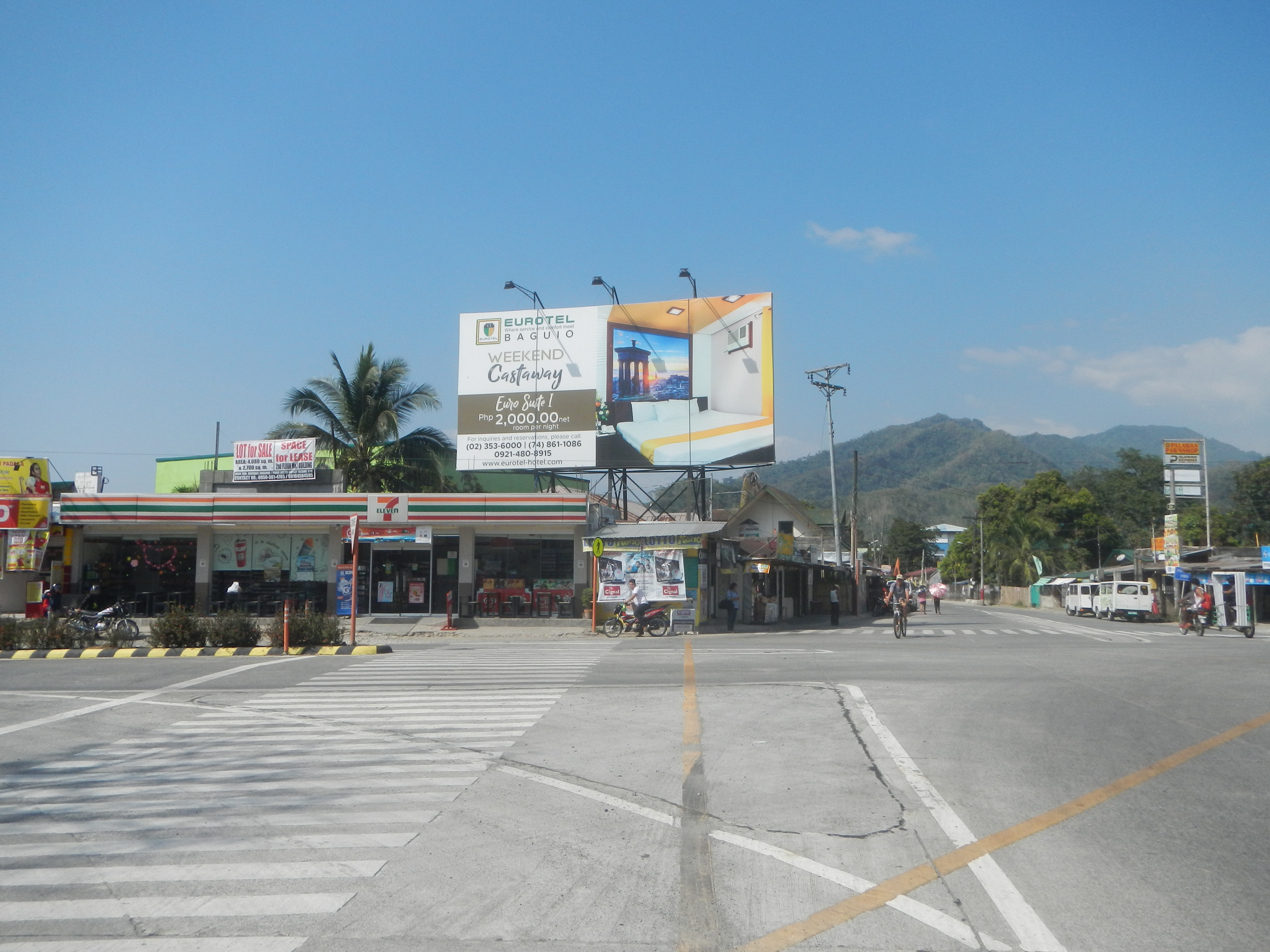
Town Proper

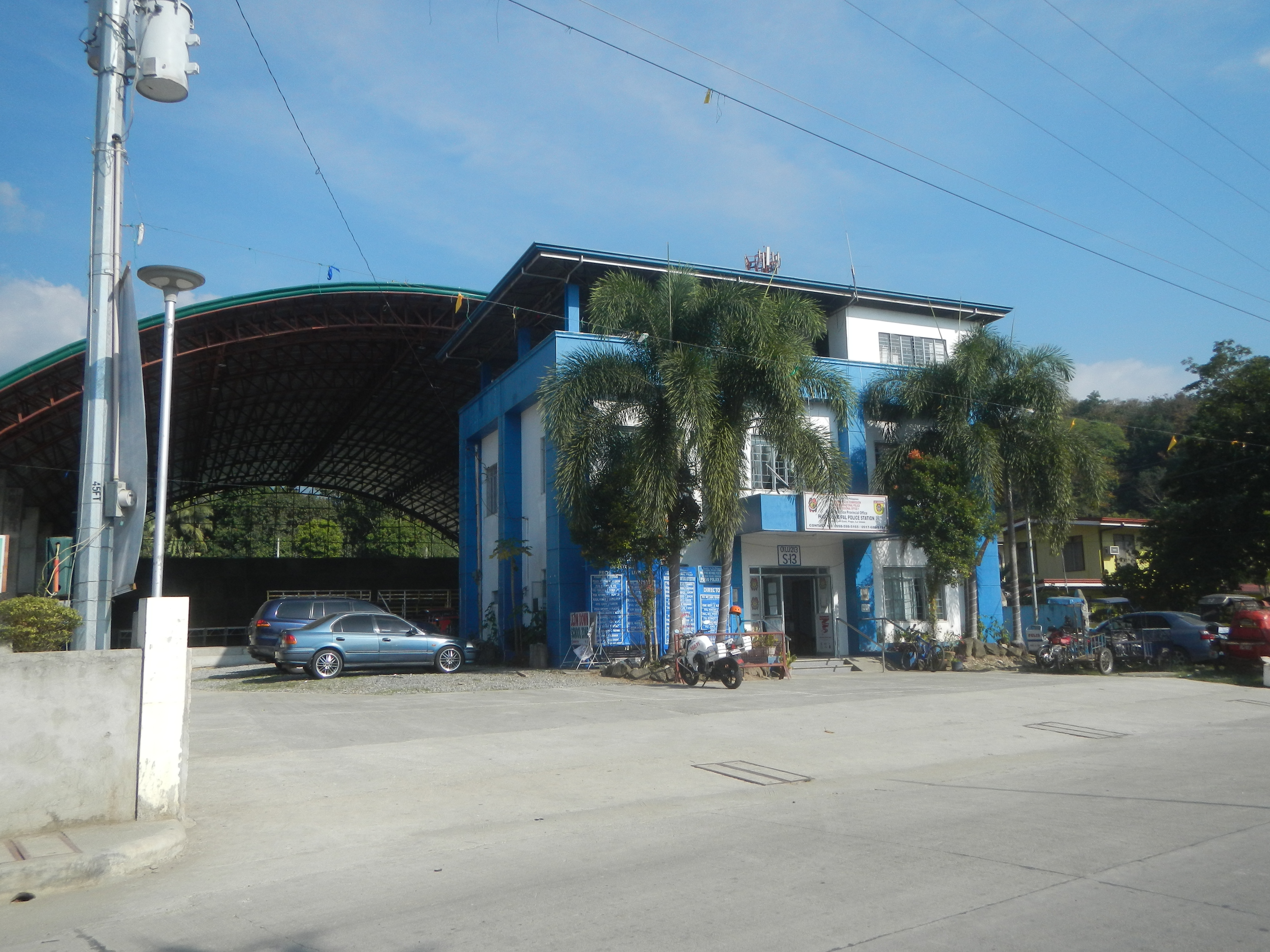
Police Station

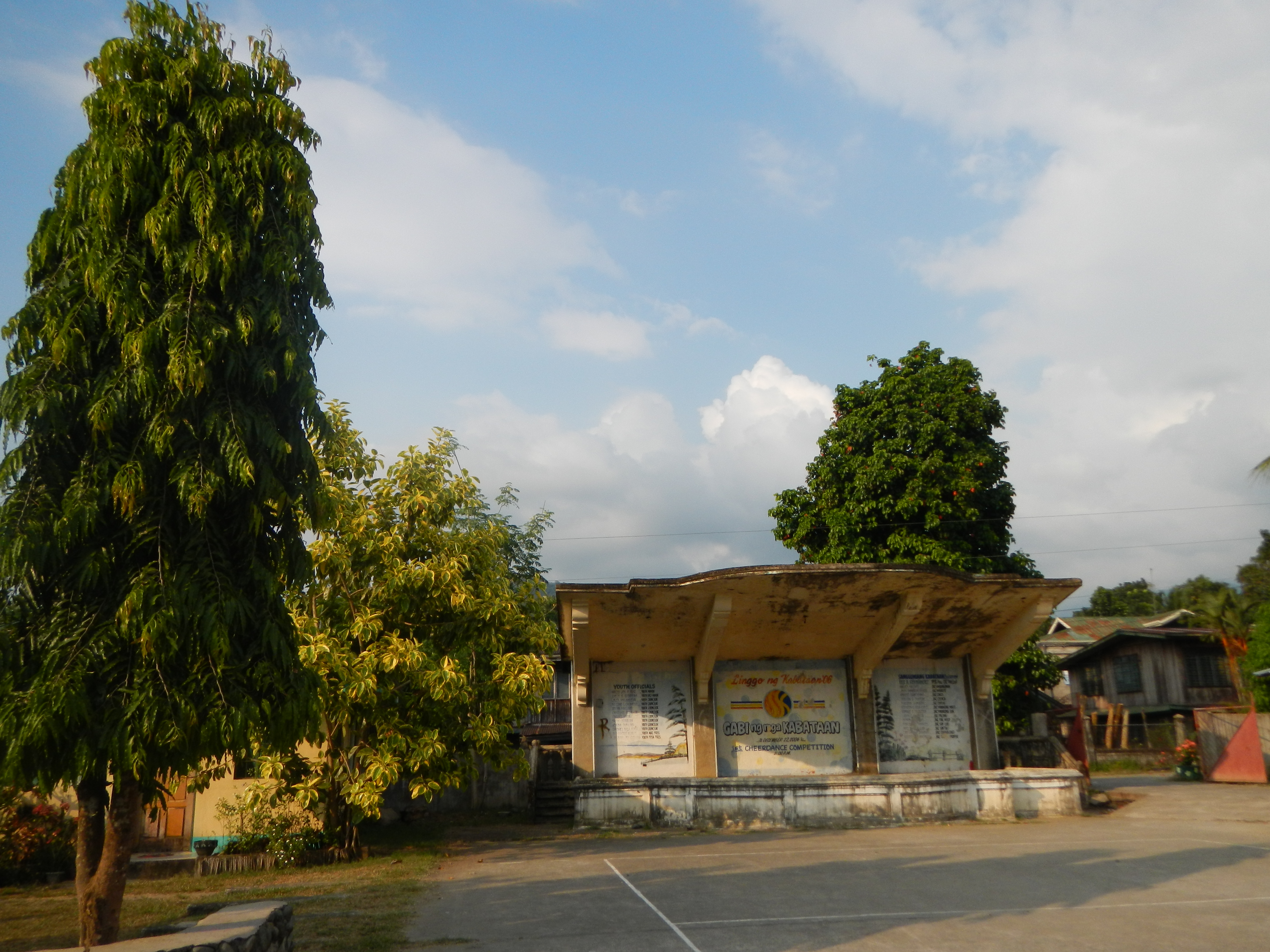
Town plaza

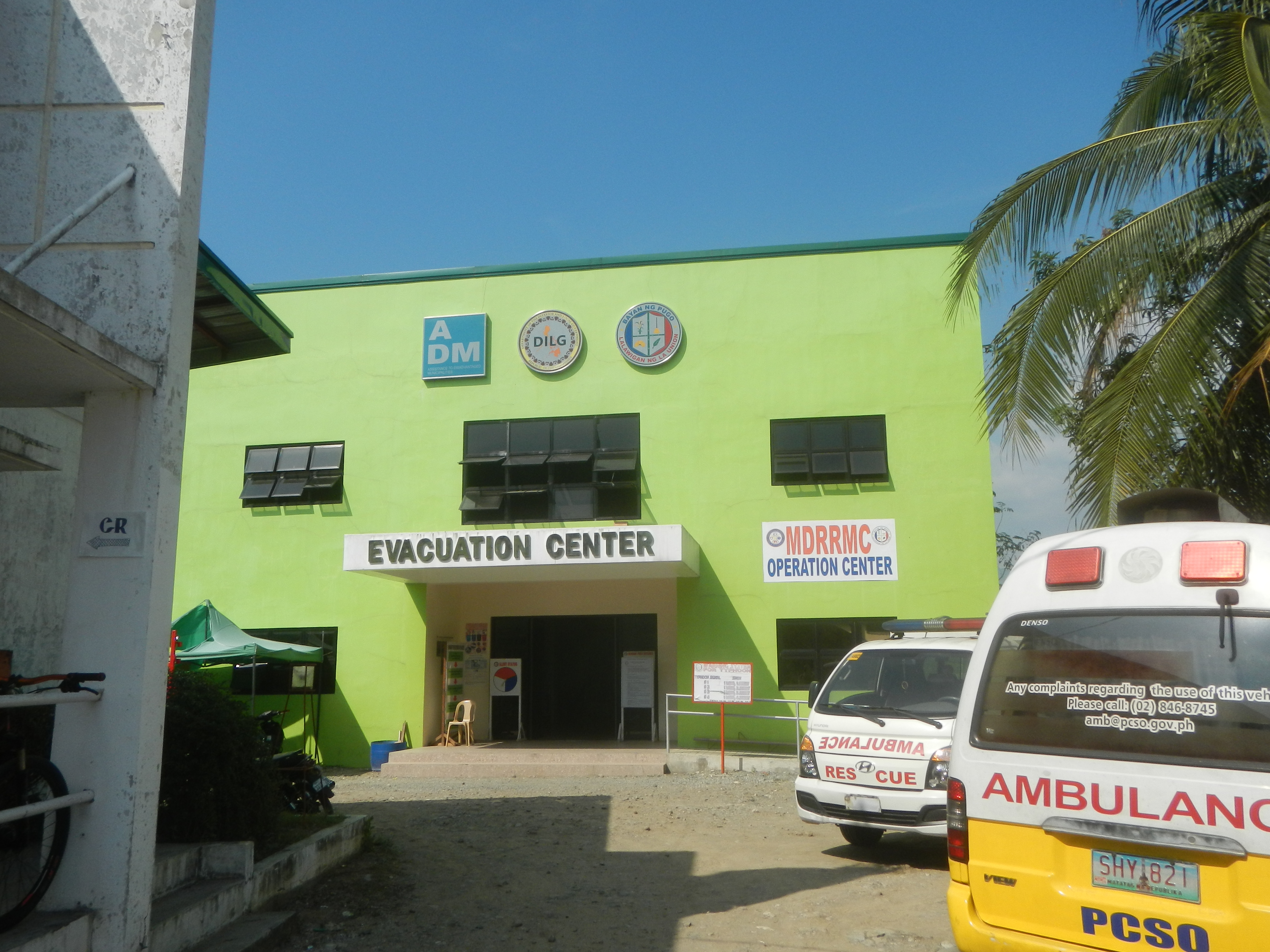
Pugo Evacuation Center

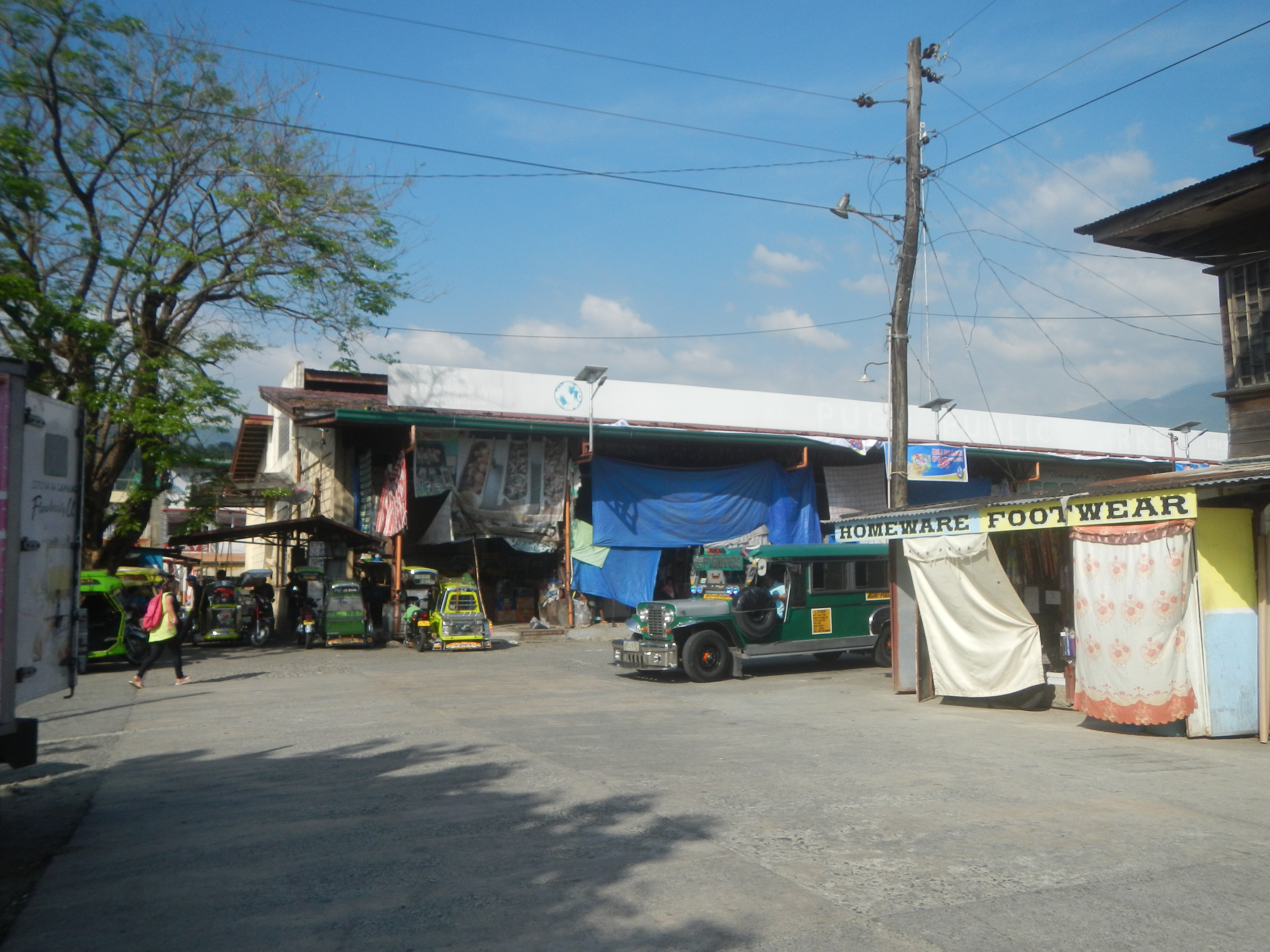
Public Market
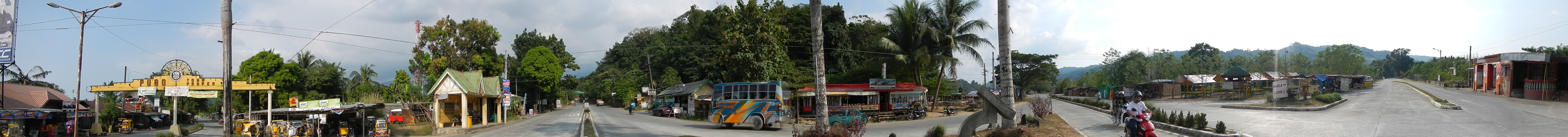
Panorama of the Crossing and Welcome arch
