= Forevermore (TV series) =

2014–15 Philippine television drama series

- Title card
- Genre: Romantic comedy; Drama
- Created by: ABS-CBN Studios; Jay Fernando
- Developed by: ABS-CBN Studios
- Written by: Rona Co; Jerome Co; Mark Angos; Generiza Reyes; Olivia M. Lamasan
- Directed by: Cathy Garcia-Molina; Richard I. Arellano; Theodore C. Boborol; Rory B. Quintos
- Creative director: Johnny delos Santos
- Starring: Enrique Gil; Liza Soberano
- Theme music composer: Side A
- Opening theme: "Forevermore" by Juris Fernandez and Jay Durias
- Composer: Joey Generoso
- Country of origin: Philippines
- Original languages: Tagalog (Filipino); Ilocano
- No. of seasons: 2
- No. of episodes: 148 (list of episodes)

Production
- Executive producers: Carlo Katigbak; Cory Vidanes; Laurenti Dyogi; Malou Santos
- Producers: Edlyn Tallada-Abuel; Myleen Ongkiko; Des M. De Guzman
- Production locations: Baguio; Tuba, Benguet; La Trinidad, Benguet; Manila; Antipolo, Rizal
- Editors: Jay Mendoza; Jeric Hernandez
- Running time: 28–40 minutes
- Production company: Star Creatives

Original release
- Network: ABS-CBN
- Release: October 27, 2014 – May 22, 2015

Forevermore is a Philippine television drama romance series broadcast by ABS-CBN. Directed by Cathy Garcia-Molina, Richard I. Arellano, Theodore C. Boborol and Rory B. Quintos it stars Enrique Gil and Liza Soberano. It aired on the network's Primetime Bida line up and worldwide on TFC from October 27, 2014, to May 22, 2015, replacing Ikaw Lamang and was replaced by Pangako sa 'Yo.

== Plot ==
This is the story of Alexander "Xander" Grande III (Enrique Gil), the rebellious, broken, only child of a hotel magnate, and Maria Agnes Calay (Liza Soberano), the humble, beautiful and hardworking daughter of a strawberry farmer in La Presa, Benguet. They cross paths when Xander crashes into Agnes' strawberry truck while BASE jumping. After the incident, his parents force him to pay for the damages by living and working at the strawberry farm without comfortable amenities, alongside Agnes and her strawberry farm community. Xander's immersion in a different world is not easy for both, but Agnes and the La Presa community transform him from an entitled broken boy into a very charming, understanding, and caring man. Xander and Agnes fall deeply in love with each other. Meanwhile, Xander has unfinished business with his first love, Kate Saavedra (Sofia Andres), who is struggling with their break up. Xander and Agnes' love is further challenged when they get entangled in the strawberry farm land dispute between their families. A mature Xander makes the greatest sacrifice for Agnes, the woman he loves the most, and they part ways. As fate would have it, after two years of separation, they meet again.

== Cast and characters ==
=== Main cast ===
Cast	Character	Character information
Enrique Gil	Alexander "Xander" Rosales Grande III	The rebellious son of Alexander and Bettina. He is Agnes's love interest and they become engaged at the end.
Liza Soberano	Maria Agnes Calay-Grande	Agnes is a strong-willed farmer's daughter, who is in love with Xander.

=== Supporting cast ===
Cast	Character	Character information
Sofia Andres	Katherine "Kate" Saavedra	Xander's ex-girlfriend and first love, who initially refuses to move on from their relationship. Mentally unstable and emotionally dependent on Xander at the start of the series, she returns and tries to stand in between Agnes and Xander's relationship and does her best to win Xander back. The disastrous events in La Presa is due to her family's (mostly her father's) doing, injuring the strawberry farmers and hurting the Grande family's reputation. After two years of therapy in America, Kate shows self-growth and steadily improves, finally accepts Xander's love for Agnes and stands up against her menacing father.
Joey Marquez	Buboy "Papang / Mang Bubs" Calay	Agnes's supportive father.
Lilet	Bettina Rosales	Second wife of Alex Grande II and Xander's mother. Initially, Bettina is seen as a scheming woman who dislikes Agnes because of the disparity of their socio-economic backgrounds and tries to undermine her and Xander. She eventually warms up to Agnes and recognizes her positive influence on her son. She has lived under the shadows of her domineering mother-in-law and a first wife.
Zoren Legaspi	Alexander "Alex" Grande II	Xander's strict father but eases up and becomes a good father.
Irma Adlawan	Mirasol Amparo	Papang's second wife and Agnes's stepmother.
Marissa Delgado	Doña Soledad Grande	The strong domineering grandmother of Xander, who dislikes Agnes.
Jason Francisco	Orly Cranberry	Xander's executive assistant and one of the heroes of the series.
Beverly Salviejo	Margarita "Meg" Gomez	The assistant of Doña Soledad Grande.
Diego Loyzaga	Jay Fernandez	A friend of Agnes from college in Manila, who later falls in love with Agnes.
Yves Flores	Andrew "Drew" Fontanilla	Agnes's friend who hates Xander at first but later becomes his friend.
Kit Thompson	Julius San Juan	Sheri's brother.
Joj Agpangan	Clauie Bernales	Initially, Clauie is a brat, jealous of Agnes and bullies her a lot but eventually she and Agnes become friends in La Presa community.
Jai Agpangan	Judy Bernales	Agnes's best friend and Clauie's twin sister.
Pinky Amador	Sheri San Juan-Grande	"The manipulative ex-wife", who tries to undermine Bettina in the inheritance fight after Alex dies. She is directly involved in sabotaging the main water supply in the forest.
Almira Muhlach	Marites "Mamang" Calay	Papang's ex-wife and Agnes' biological mother who left them to work abroad as an OFW.

=== Extended cast ===
- Nonong "Bangkay" de Andres as Mang Banky
- Lilia Cuntapay as Aling Aunor
- Jesse James Ongteco as Niknok
- Marco Gumabao as JC
- CJ Navato as Dexter
- Bernadette Allyson-Estrada as Loulie Perez-Saavedra
- Joe Gruta as Ka Sebio
- Pepe Herrera as Cesar Bernales
- Karen Dematera as Karen Poe
- Raymond Osmena as Damian
- Igi Boy Flores as Momon
- Michael Flores as Congressman Jaime Saavedra

=== Guest cast ===
- Karen Reyes as Charlotte
- Devon Seron as Jasmine
- Elisse Joson as Roselle
- Hyubs Azarcon as Sir Biboy
- Kitkat as Shiela
- Erin Ocampo as Patricia Alexandra Decena
- Mymy Davao as Tanya
- Ricky Rivero as himself (TV Host for Top Bad Boy)
- Marina Benipayo as Stephanie "Steph" Montecillo–Camembert
- Rolando Inocencio as President of Rallos University
- Evelyn "Matutina" Guerrero as Aling Pasencia
- Gio Alvarez as Atty. Mateo "Teo" Salazar
- Jojo Alejar as Frank Martin
- Ana Capri as Tetay Fernandez
- Miguel Morales, Daniel Ombao and Renz Michael as Jay's best friends
- Anjo Damiles as Jonathan Acosta
- ChicoSci as themselves in La Presa Palooza
- Callalily as themselves in Battle of the Bands
- 6cyclemind as themselves in Battle of the Bands
- Banda ni Kleggy as themselves in Battle of the Bands
- Dennis Padilla as Alex's father
- Myrtle Sarrosa as Jessica
- Mel Kimura as Venus
- Jasper Visaya as Jass
- Yayo Aguila as Taps
- Chase Vega as Hapon
- Luz Fernandez as Aling Galietta
- Gabriel Sumalde as Sebastian "Basty" Grande
- John Wayne Sace as Kano
- Arnold Reyes as Tim
- Erich Gonzales as Alexandra "Alex" Pante
- Alfred Martin as young Alexander "Xander" Grande
- Rhed Bustamante as young Maria Agnes Calay

== Episodes ==
Season	Episodes	Originally aired	
Season	Episodes	First aired	Last aired
1	74	October 27, 2014	February 5, 2015
2	74	February 6, 2015	May 22, 2015

== Awards and nominations ==
Year	Award	Category	Recipient(s)	Result
2014	Eastern Visayas State University Student's Choice Mass Media Awards	Best Primetime TV Series	Forevermore	Won
2015	13th Gawad Tanglaw Awards	Best TV Series	Forevermore	Won
2015	29th PMPC Star Awards for Television	Best Primetime TV Series	Forevermore	Nominated
2015	29th PMPC Star Awards for Television	Best Supporting Actress	Sofia Andres	Nominated
2015	ALTA Media Icon Awards	Best Drama Series	Forevermore	Won
2016	12th USTV Student's Choice Awards	Student's Choice of Drama Program	Forevermore	Nominated
2016	47th GMMSF Box-Office Entertainment Awards	Most Popular Primetime Drama	Forevermore	Won
2016	47th GMMSF Box-Office Entertainment Awards	Most Popular Love Team of Movies and TV	Liza Soberano and Enrique Gil	Won
2016	7th Northwestern Samar State University Student's Choice Awards	Best Primetime Series	Forevermore	Won
2016	3rd Paragala Central Luzon Media Awards	Best Teleserye	Forevermore	Won
2016	3rd Paragala Central Luzon Media Awards	Best TV Actor	Enrique Gil	Won
2016	Philippine Pediatric Society Media Awards for Local Television Gawad Duyan	Gintong Kolong-Kolong Awardee	Forevermore	Won

== Reruns ==
The show began airing reruns on Jeepney TV from February 13 to April 7, 2017; from May 26 to September 15, 2018; from August 26 to December 6, 2019; from July 13, 2020, to January 15, 2021. The series also aired on PIE Channel from September 25 to December 29, 2023. But was abruptly cut for the channel's closure, and aired under All Time Saya primetime block of Jeepney TV and ALLTV from May 13 to December 6, 2024, 4 months after the closure.

== International broadcasts ==
- Indonesia — MNCTV
- Kenya — StarTimes Novela E1
- Kazakhstan — Channel 31
- Malaysia — Astro Prima & Astro Mustika HD
- Thailand — GMM 25

== International adaptation ==
Vermem Seni Ellere, a Turkish adaptation produced by AKN Film, aired on ATV from June 18, 2023, to August 13, 2023, for a total of nine episodes. It starred Buse Meral as Zeliş and Emre Bey as Mehmet.

== Reception ==
=== Ratings ===
KANTAR MEDIA NATIONAL TV RATINGS (8:30PM PST)
PILOT EPISODE	FINALE EPISODE	PEAK	AVERAGE	SOURCE
27.1%	39.3%	39.3%	TBA	

=== Critical response ===
Forevermore largely received positive reviews from viewers. University of the Philippines film professor Ed Cabagnot attributed the program's success to "lightness and the wholesomeness of the love story." He said that "It is a relief from all the other teleserye saturating television prime time revolving around themes of infidelities and family troubles." Former ABS-CBN president and CEO Charo Santos-Concio praised the series for it "acknowledged the goodness of the Filipino as seen through pakikipagkapwa-tao in a community."

=== Cultural impact ===
For the first time in Philippine TV history, the series' principal setting Sitio Pungayan in Mount Cabuyao, Tuba, Benguet, coined as "La Presa", a strawberry farm home to Agnes and Xander, became a tourist phenomenon. The City of Baguio has adopted a resolution commending the show's contribution in the promotion of the tourism in the city.

According to Resolution Numbered 92, the City of Baguio remarked:

"Due to the popularity of the said teleserye, tourists and visitors have been flocking to the City of Baguio to visit and get a glimpse of 'La Presa' which has become an instant tourist attraction for the City of Baguio and Tuba, Benguet."

While the remote place led to growth of businesses with more than 170 roadside stalls set up and became a source of livelihood, the unprecedented influx of fans from across the country, and even abroad, caused traffic congestion and accumulation of garbage in the area. This concern prompted the Supreme Court to issue a Temporary Environmental Protection Order (TEPO) in September 2014. In May 2015, two weeks before the soap ended, the Court of Appeals issued a Writ of Kalikasan and made a Permanent Environmental Protection Order (PEPO). In February 2019, the Department of Environment and Natural Resources in Cordillera Administrative Region reminded the public that the fictional community is still off-limits to visitors.
