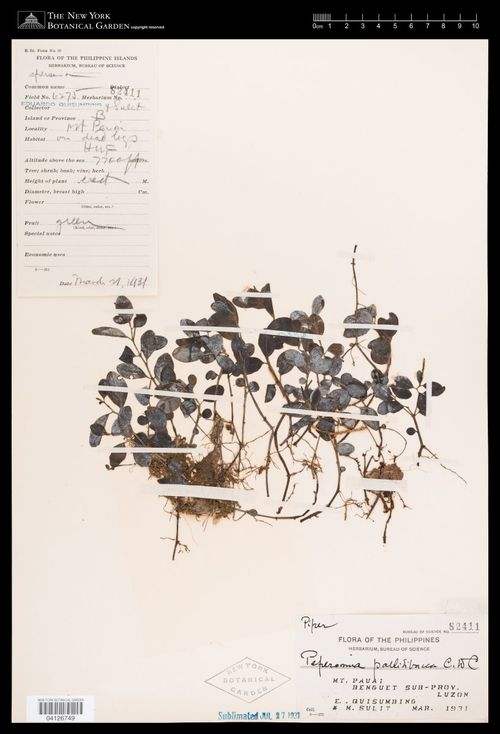

Scientific classification
- Kingdom: Plantae
- Clade: Tracheophytes
- Clade: Angiosperms
- Clade: Magnoliids
- Order: Piperales
- Family: Piperaceae
- Genus: Peperomia
- Species: P. pallidibacca

Binomial name
- Peperomia pallidibacca C.DC.

Synonyms
- Peperomia panaiana C.DC.; Peperomia ramosii C.DC.

= Peperomia pallidibacca =

Species of flowering plant

Peperomia pallidibacca is a species of epiphyte in the genus Peperomia that is endemic in Philippines. It grows on wet tropical biomes. Its conservation status is Threatened.

== Description ==
The type specimen were collected near Baguio, Philippines.

Peperomia pallidibacca has leaves that are elliptic lance shaped, narrowed at both base and tip, with three veins, smooth on top and not densely hairy underneath, with hairy leaf stalks. Flower stalks grow from the leaf axils, three times longer than the leaf stalks, thin and smooth. Flower spikes are smooth and at maturity equal the leaf blades in length. The bract is circular with a very short stalk at the center. Anthers are elliptic. The ovary emerges above the flower, is egg shaped, and bears the stigma slightly below the tip. The stigma is dot shaped and smooth. The berry is round, scattered with small glands, and lacks a false cupule.

It is a herb growing among mosses on trees and rooting at the nodes. Branches that bear spikes are nearly 9 cm (3.5 in) long, densely covered with stiff hairs, and 0.5 mm thick. Leaves are alternate. Leaf blades are papery when dried, the upper ones up to 2 cm long and 12 mm wide, the lower ones more reverse egg shaped and up to 23 mm long. Leaf stalks are up to 5 mm long. Spikes are 0.5 mm thick. The central axis is eventually drawn out under the berry into a conical process. The berry is stalkless and nearly 0.75 mm long.

== Taxonomy and naming ==
It was described in 1910 by Casimir de Candolle in Leaflets of Philippine Botany 3, from specimens collected by Adolph D. E. Elmer. It got its name description of the type specimen.

== Distribution and habitat ==
It is endemic in Philippines. It grows on a epiphyte environment and is a herb. It grows on wet tropical biomes.

== Conservation ==
This species is assessed as Threatened, in a preliminary report.
