= Pugo =

Pugo may refer to:

- Pugo (comedian), Mariano Contreras (1910–1978), Filipino comedian and vaudevillian
- Boris Pugo (1937–1991), Soviet politician
- Pugo, La Union, a municipality in the Philippines
- Pugo River, or Tapuacan River, in La Union, Philippines
- Pugo dialect of the Gallong language, a Tibeto-Burman language of northeast India
