= Tapuacan River =

River in north Luzon, Philippines

Tapuacan River: Tapuakan River; Pugo River
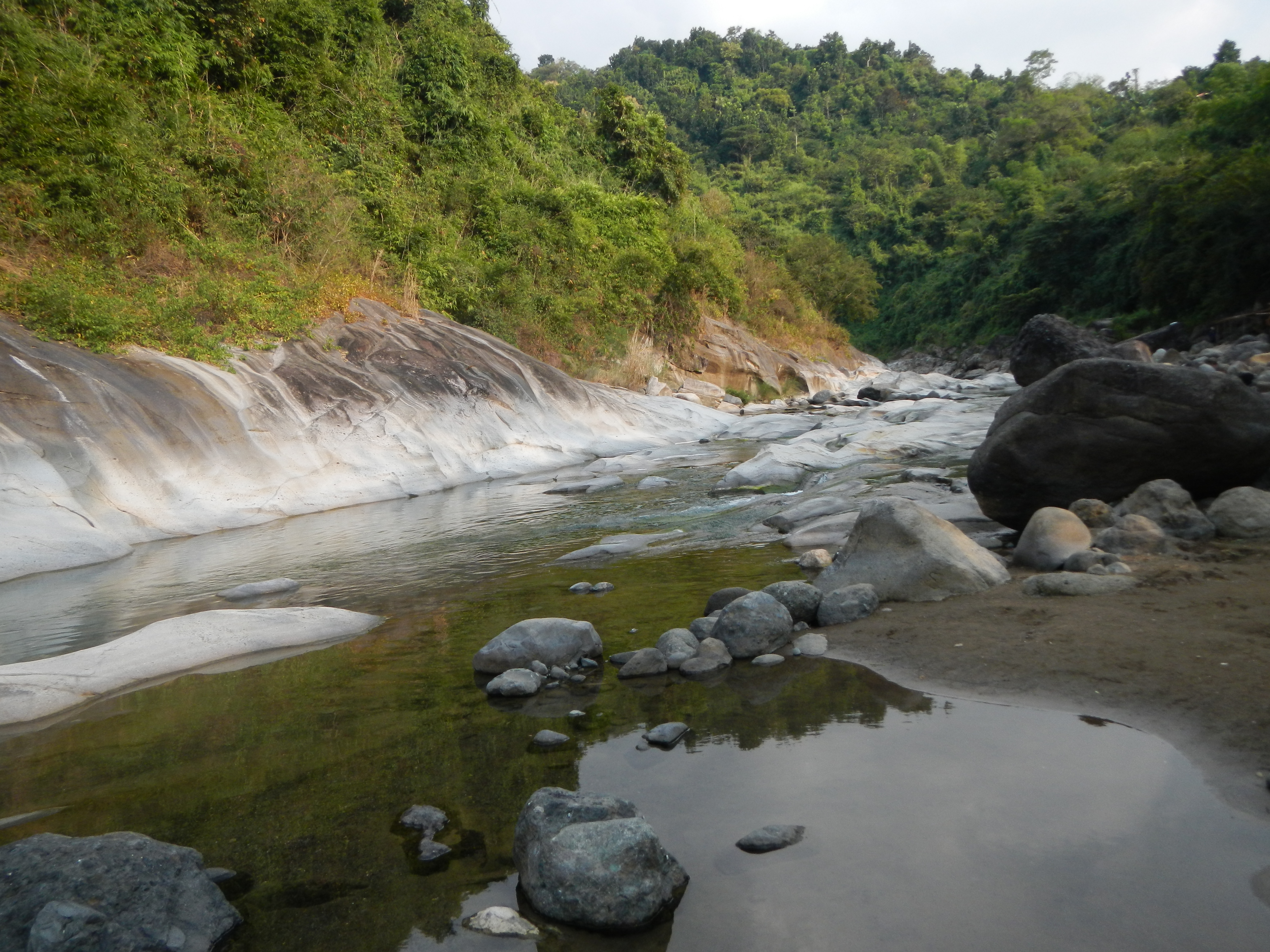

- Location within Luzon Location within Philippines

Location
- Country: Philippines
- Region: Ilocos Region; Cordillera Administrative Region
- Province: La Union; Benguet
- Municipality: Pugo; Tuba
- Barangay: Cares

Physical characteristics
- Source
  - location: Tuba, Benguet, Cordillera mountains
- Mouth: Anduyan River
  - coordinates: 16°20′08″N 120°27′17″E

Basin features
- Progression: Tapuacan–Anduyan–Aringay
- Tributaries
  - right: Najeng River

The Tapuacan River, also known as the Tapuakan River and the Pugo River, is a river located in Cares, Pugo, La Union, Philippines. Its headwaters are situated at the Santo Tomas mountain range, with the main tributary being the Najeng River located in Barangay Tabaan Norte, Tuba, Benguet.

In 2017, the river was awarded by the Regional Development Council of the Ilocos Region as the cleanest and safest inland body of water in the entire region and in La Union province.

In Ilocano, tapuakan means "a place where one can jump as high". In the river, cool and pristine water flows from the town's streams amid a huge rockbeds or large (huge and quite flat) rock formations surrounded by forests and a waterfall.

== Topography ==
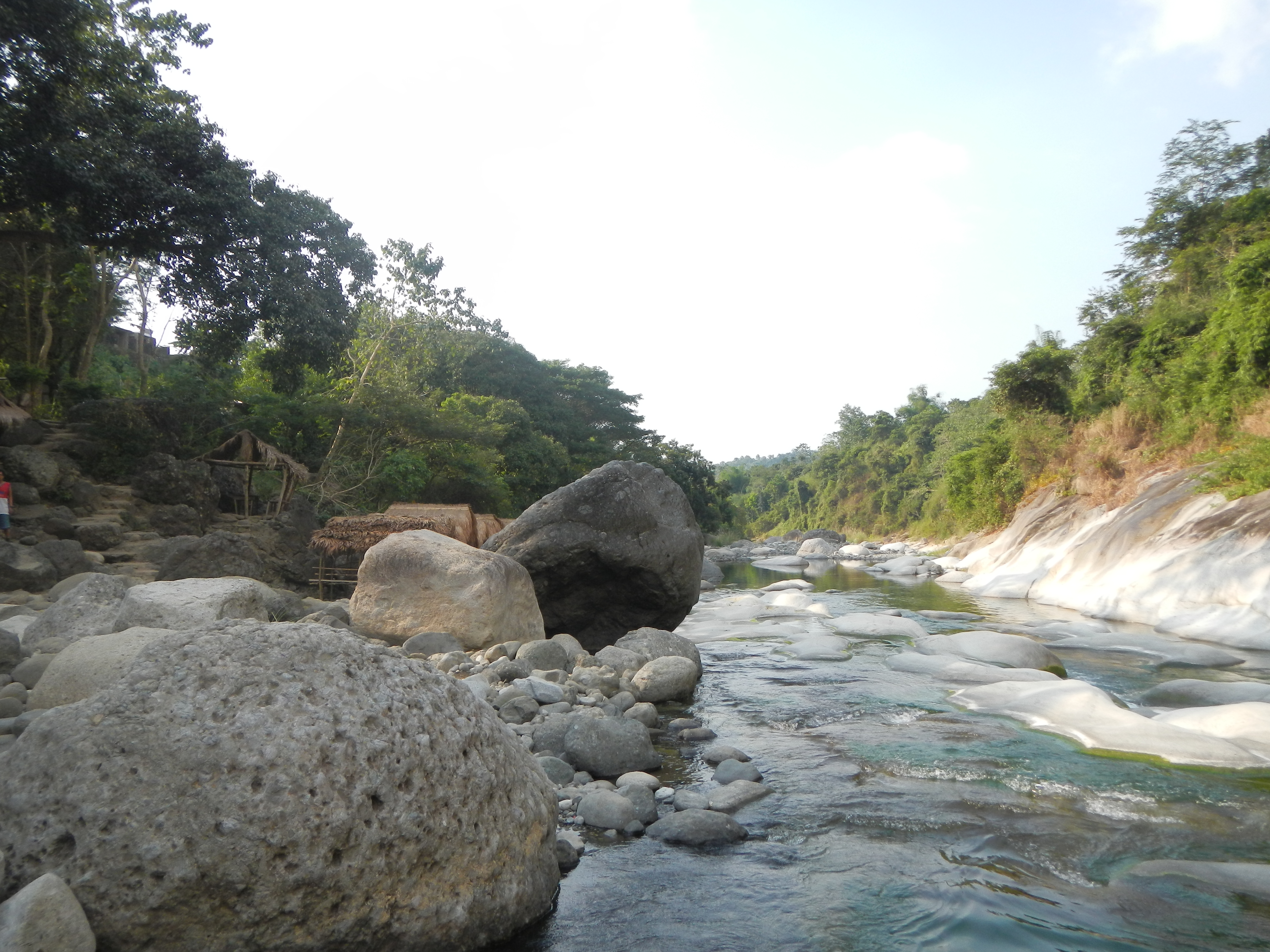
Rock formations and pristine waters

The Pugo River is a stream (a body of running water moving to a lower level in a channel on land, class H - Hydrographic) with the region font code of Asia/Pacific.

The river has crystal clear waters flowing from the mountain top towards the river mainstream, slowing down along giant stones, engulfing into the calves of other rock formations that are tact along the water's path. Its UTM position is TU20 and its Joint Operation Graphics reference is NE51-13 (with nearby cities of San Carlos City, Alaminos & Tarlac).

Tapuacan's Qiblah direction is 288.672387 degrees from North clockwise. Tapuacan is part of PUGAD (which means bird's nest) or Pugo Adventure (the whole Pugo landmark site known as the newly opened Ilocos picturesque adventure and recreation destination, covering more than 3 hectares of lush mountain, forests and cleanest river).

== Gallery ==
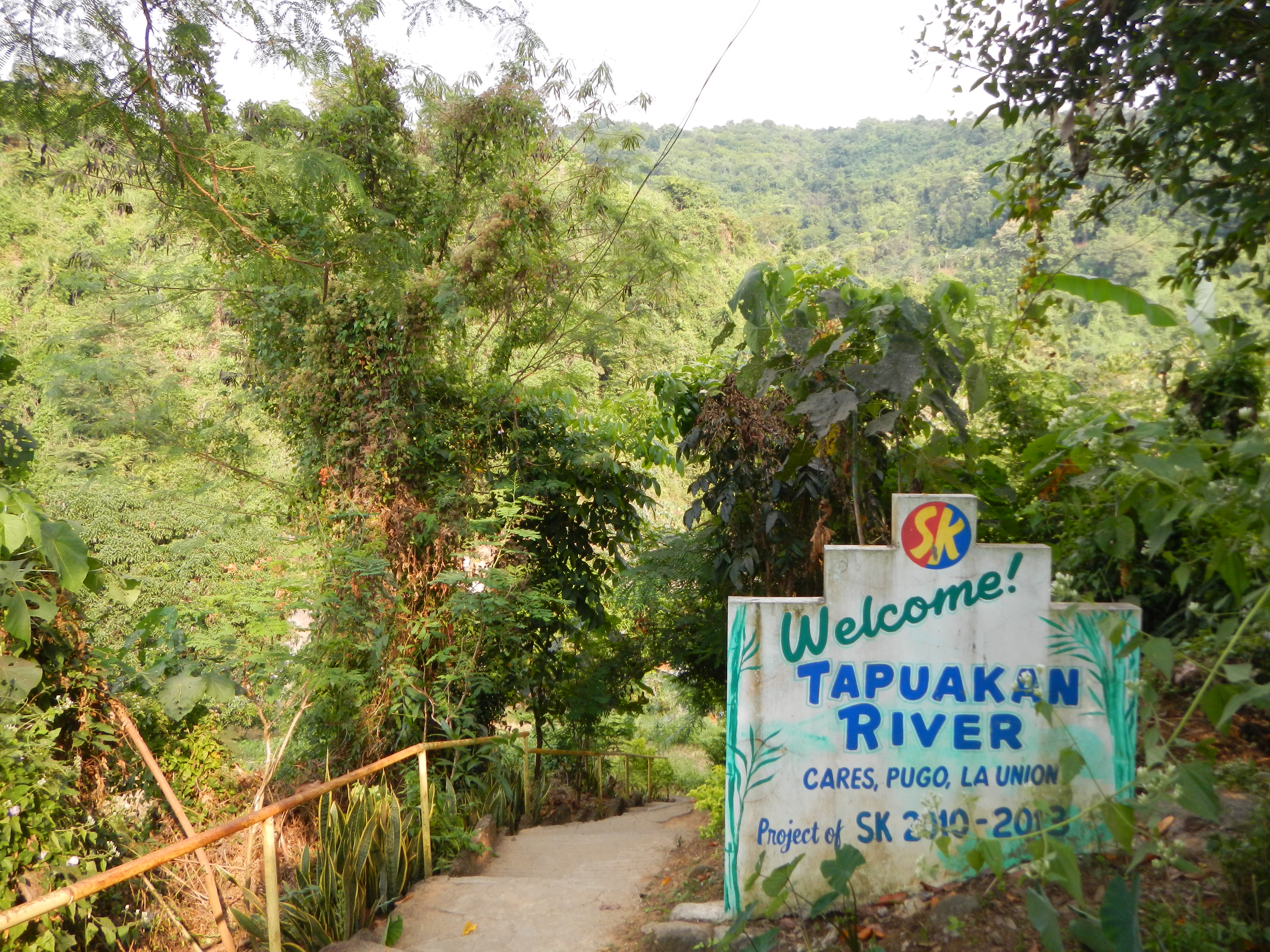
Tapuakan River welcome marker

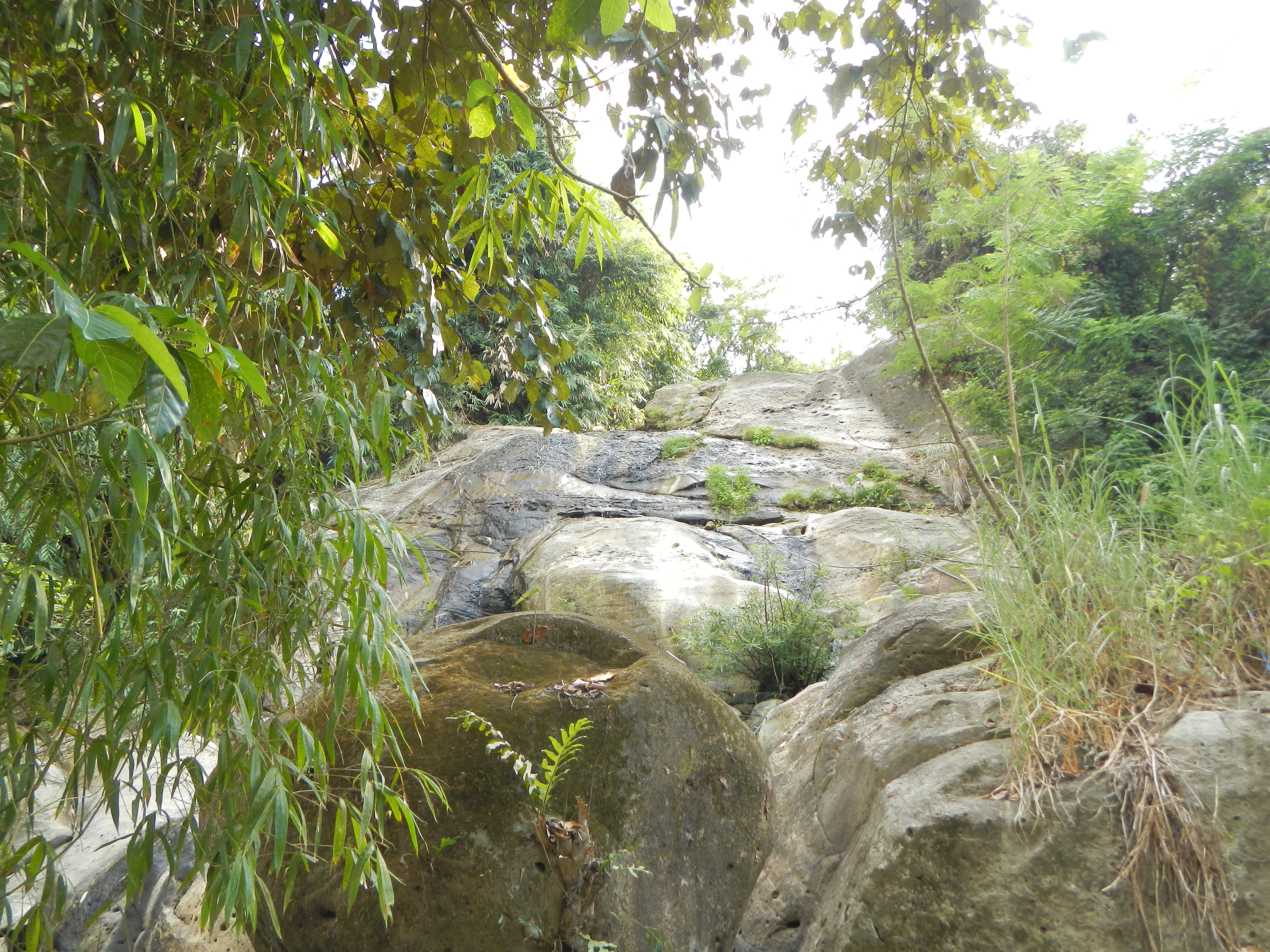
A mini-falls

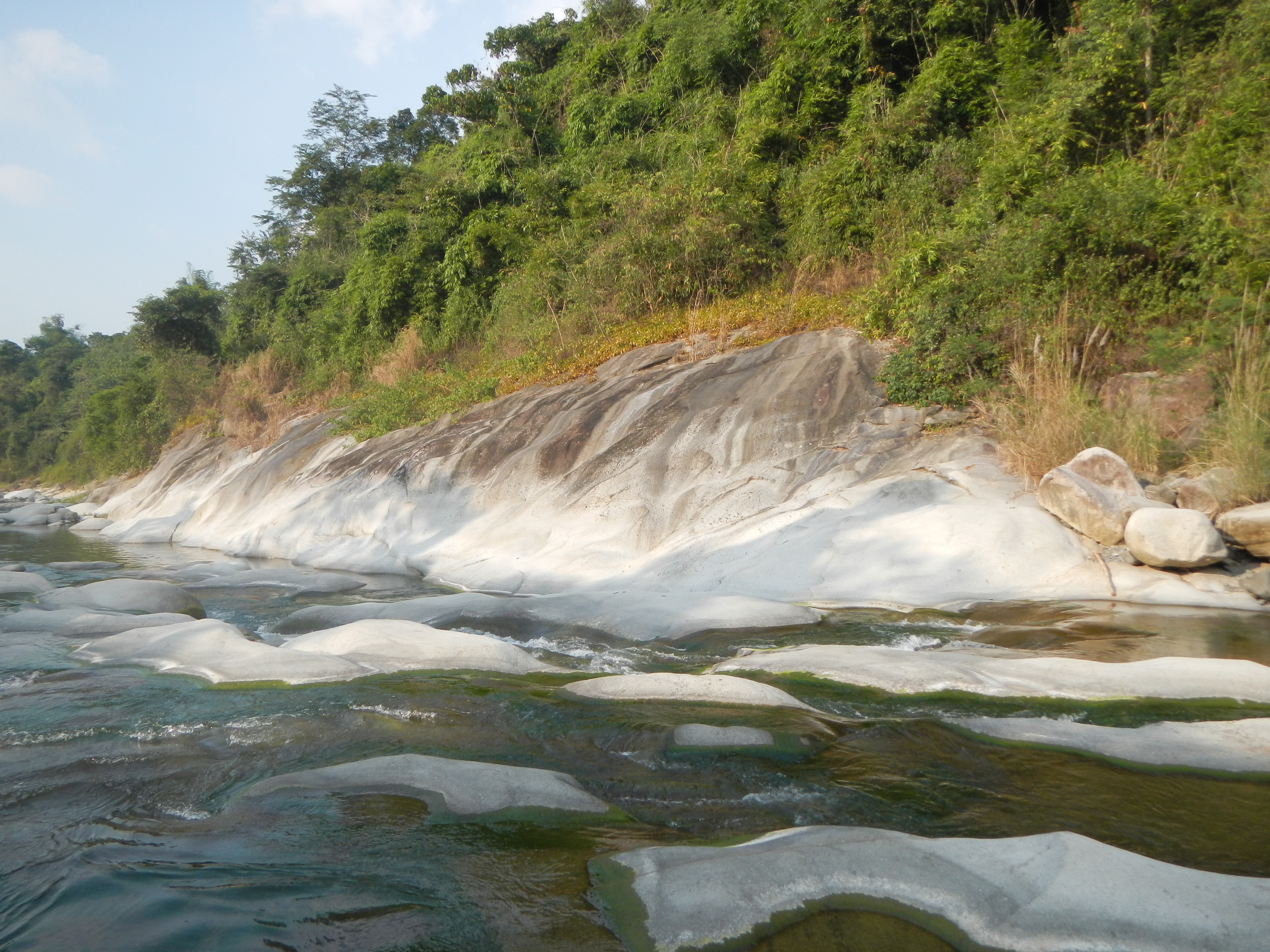
The golden sun captures the river

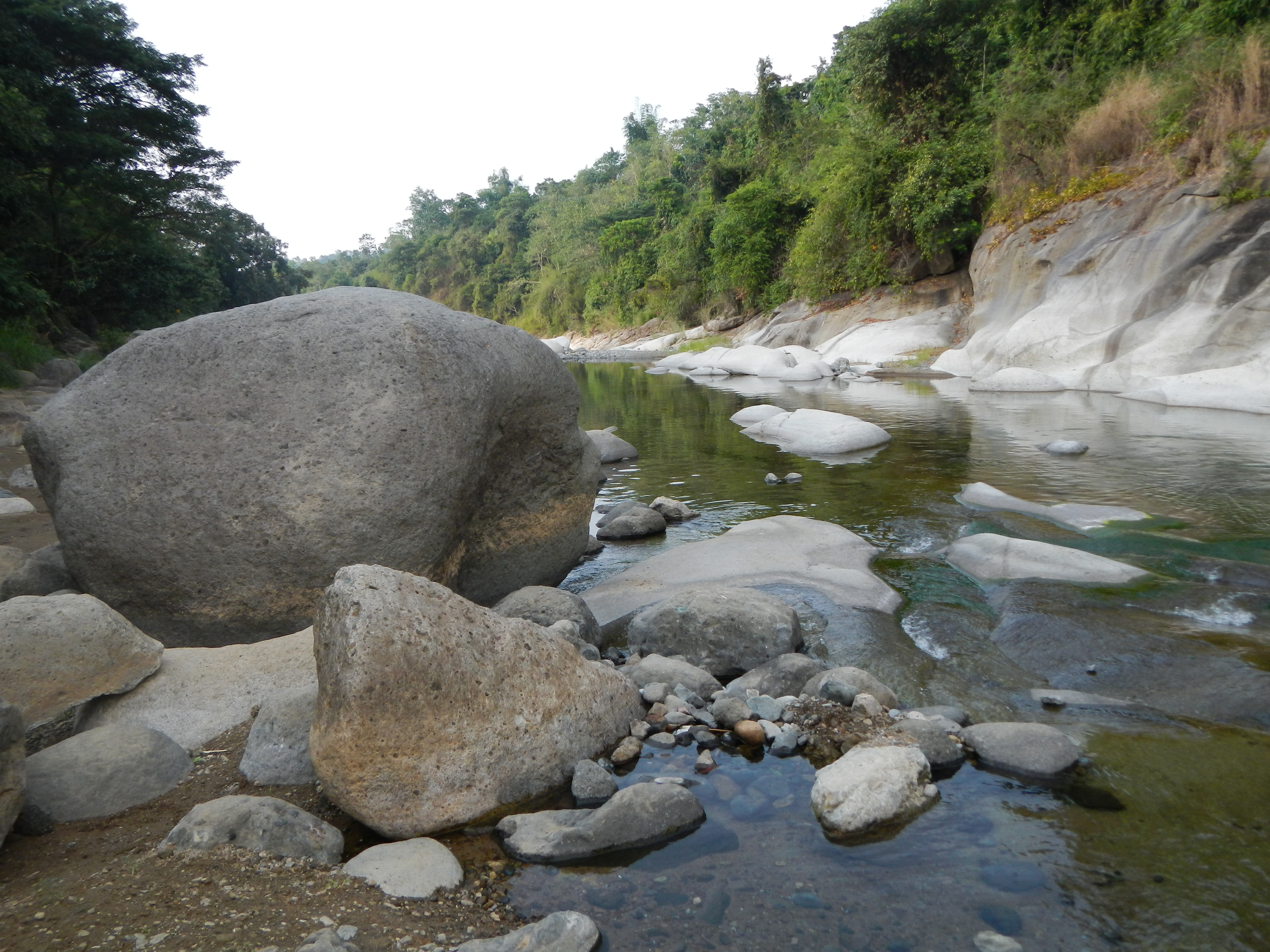
Giant rocks
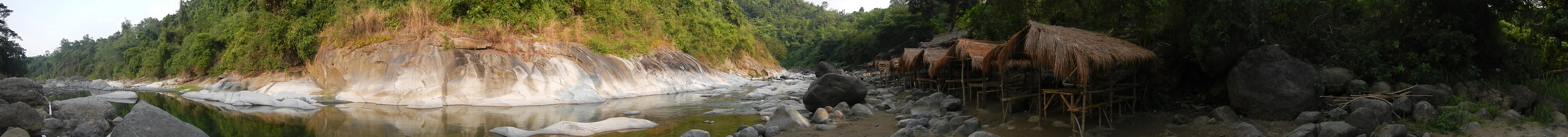
Tapuacan River panorama

== See also ==
- List of rivers of the Philippines
