= Mount Cabuyao =

Mountain in Benguet, Philippines

- Mount Kabuyao
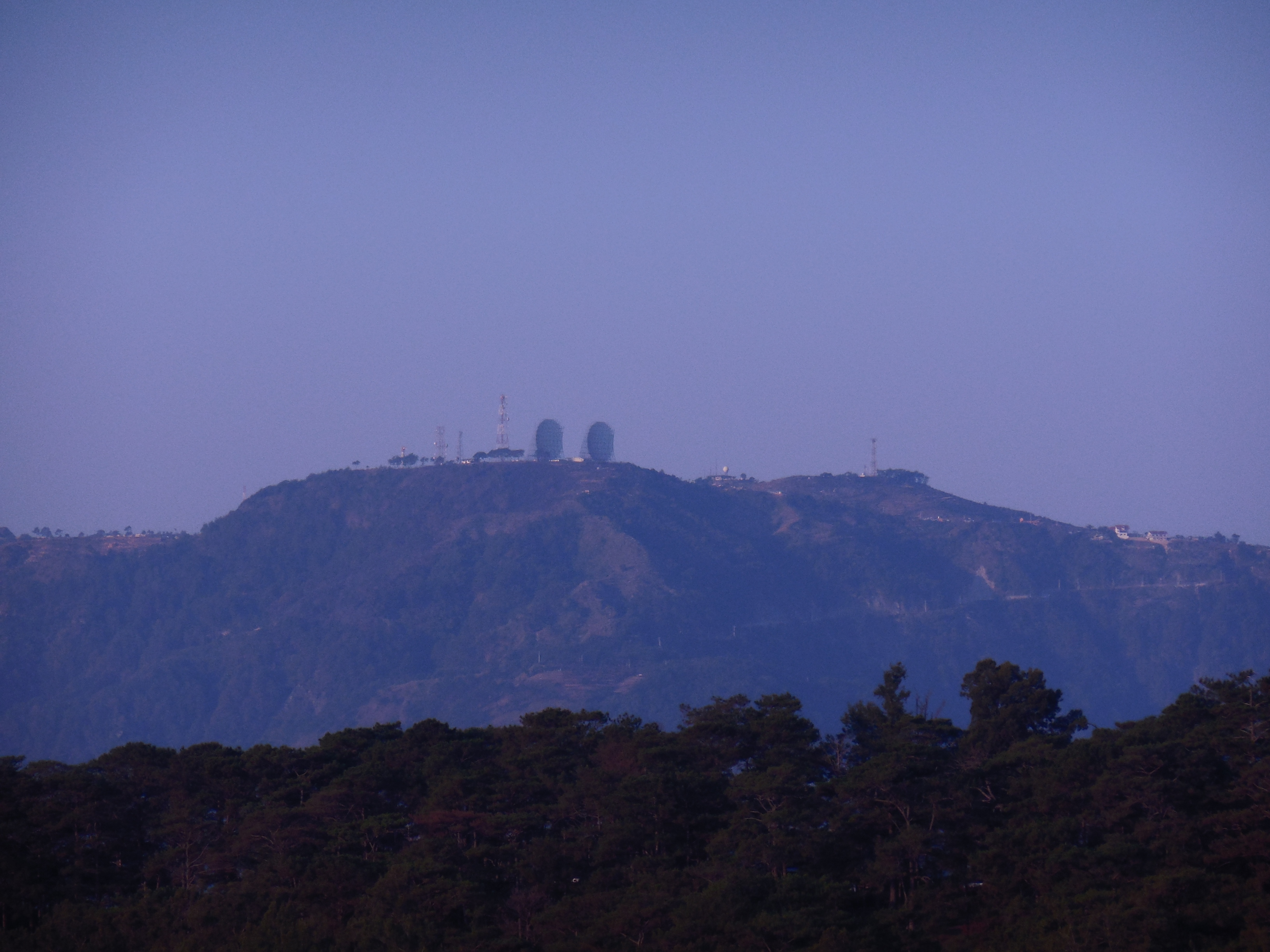
- Mount Cabuyao with the landmark two satellite dishes on its summit

Highest point
- Elevation: 2,025 m (6,644 ft)
- Prominence: 84 m (276 ft)
- Coordinates: 16°21′23″N 120°33′32.8″E

Geography
- Location within Luzon Location within Philippines
- Country: Philippines
- Region: Cordillera Administrative Region
- Province: Benguet
- City/municipality: Tuba
- Parent range: Cordillera Central

Climbing
- Easiest route: Hike

Mount Cabuyao (Ilocano: Bantay Cabuyao, Tagalog: Bundok Cabuyao), alternatively spelled as Kabuyao, is a mountain in the Philippines located in the municipality of Tuba in the province of Benguet. Its summit, rising to more than 2,000 metres (6,600 ft) above sea level, overlooks the city of Baguio. It is commonly mistaken as Mount Santo Tomas, a taller mountain just beside it.

Due to its high elevation, several communications companies constructed relay stations and radars at the summit. A private observatory and AA radar station, once operated by the US Armed Forces stationed in the country, is also located here. A water catchment area was constructed to supply water to the City of Baguio and nearby towns. A small community of farmers live at the top of the mountain. A town hall and a school was built for them by the local government.

== Tourism ==
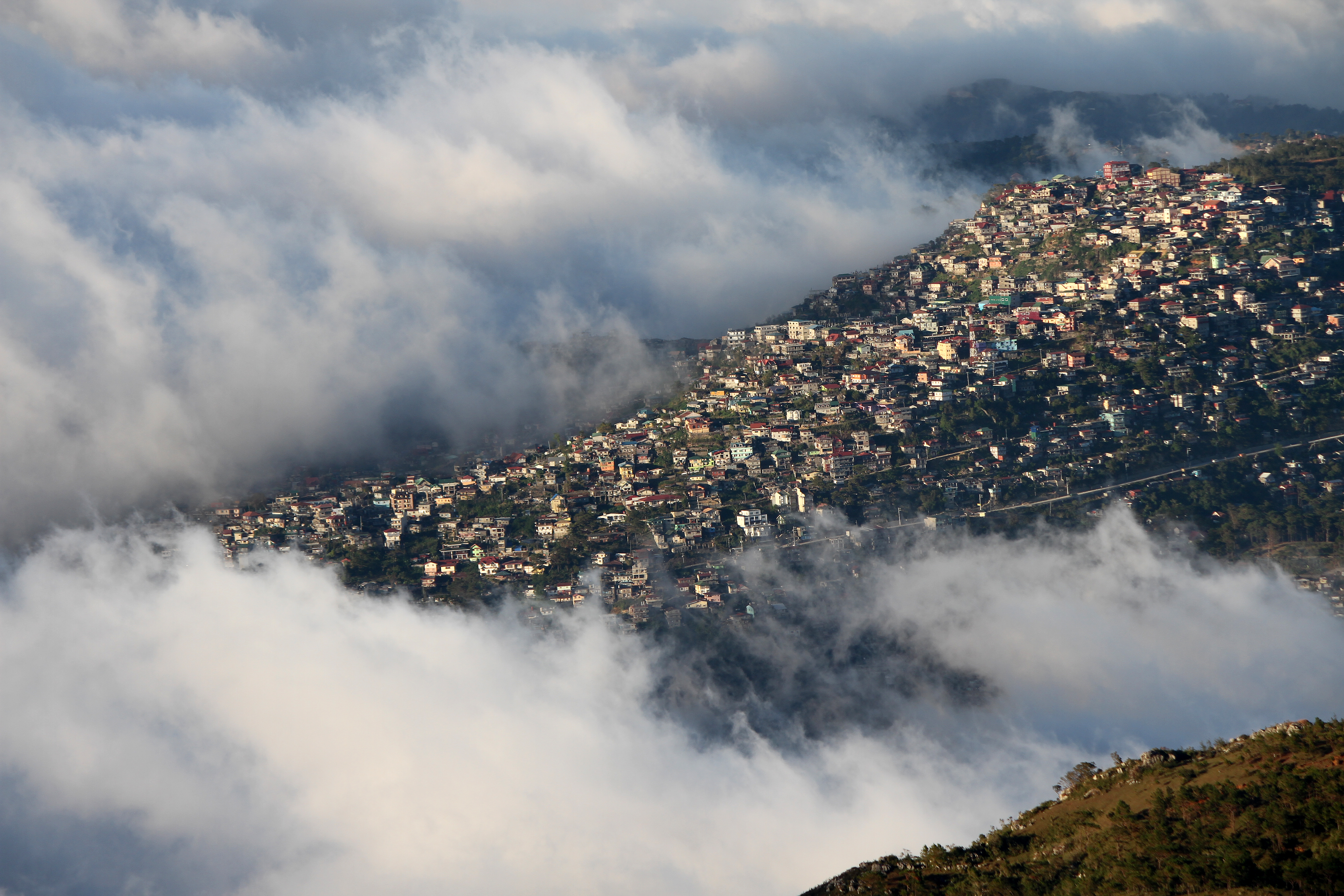
Baguio as viewed from the mountain

Currently, no tourists are allowed to visit the mountain forest reserve because of the Permanent Environment Protection Order issued by the Court of Appeals on May 5, 2015.

Previously, the two large satellite dishes at its summit have become a landmark for Baguio. The summit can also be used as a vantage point. During fair weather, one can see the whole City of Baguio to the east and could partially see the province of Pangasinan to the west. On a clear day, one can observe moving cargo ships passing by the South China Sea.

Hikers climb the mountain occasionally for recreational purposes. Biking is also popular.

== Forest cover ==
The mountain forest is part of the protected Mount Santo Tomas watershed, which supplies water to areas near the Ben Palispis Highway and other parts of Tuba. In September 2014, the Supreme Court of the Philippines ordered the temporary ceasing of development projects in a disputed area covering the forest reserve. The affected area, which has been heavily deforested, was to be developed into an eco-tourism park, as planned by Baguio Representative Nicasio Aliping Jr.
