= Naguilian Road =

Road in Luzon, Philippines

Quirino Highway
- Naguilian Road; Baguio–Bauang Road
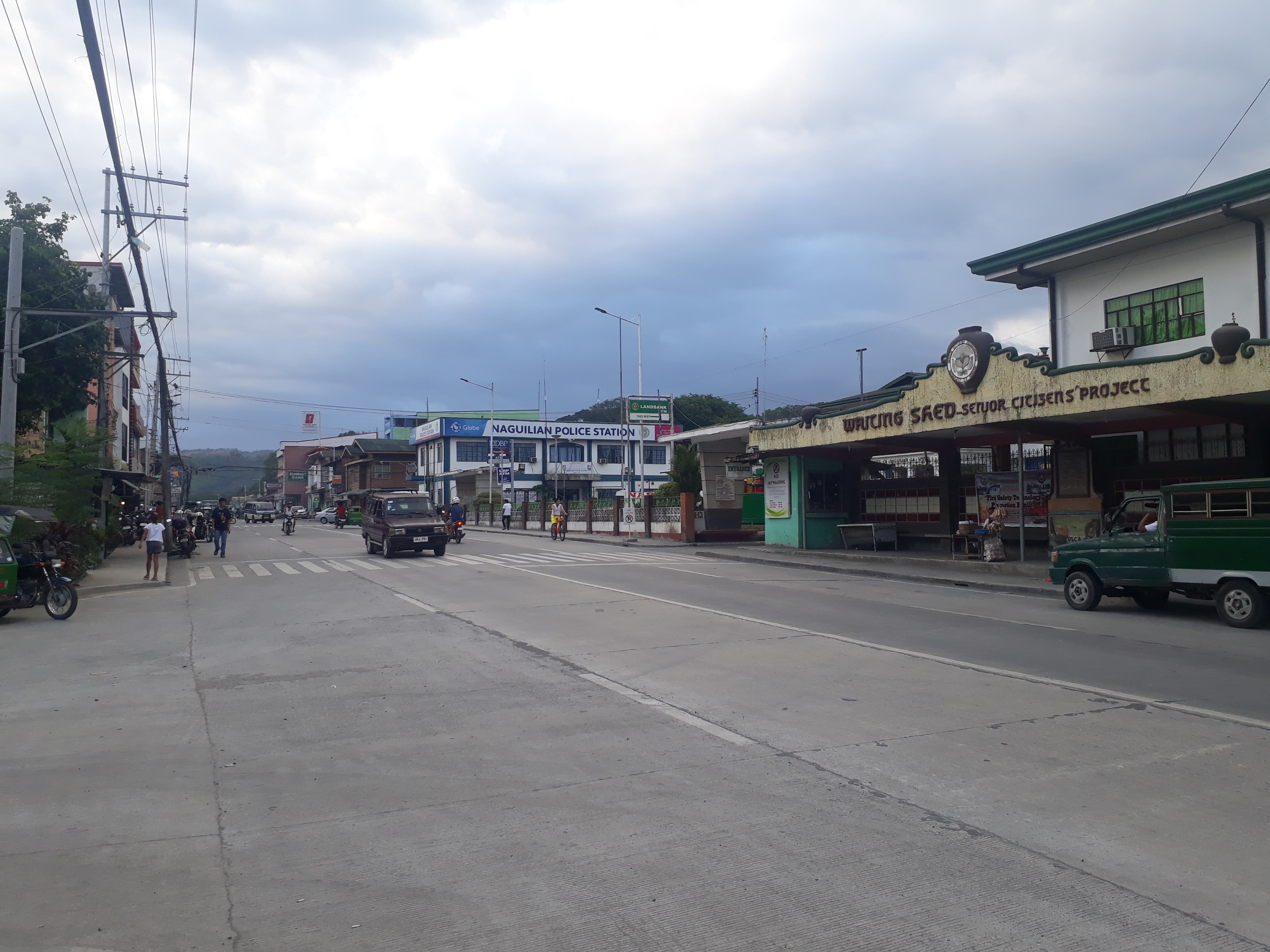
- The highway in Naguilian, La Union

Route information
- Length: 39.114 km (24.304 mi)
- Existed: Late 1800s–present
- Component highways: N54

Major junctions
- East end: N54 (Abanao Road) / Shuntug Road in Baguio
- Buhagan Road in Baguio; Ferguson Road in Baguio; Pilar Hidalgo Lim Road in Baguio; N234 (Asin–Nangalisan–San Pascual Road) in Baguio; N233 (Muñoz Drive) in Baguio; Pico–Lamtang Road in La Trinidad; Naguilian–Bagulin Road in Naguilian
- West end: N2 (Manila North Road) in Bauang

Location
- Country: Philippines
- Provinces: Benguet, La Union
- Major cities: Baguio
- Towns: Bauang, Burgos, Naguilian, Sablan, La Trinidad, Tuba

Highway system
- Roads in the Philippines; Highways; Expressways; List
| ← N53 | → N55 |

The Naguilian Road, officially the Quirino Highway and also known as the Baguio–Bauang Road, is a Philippine major highway in northern Luzon that runs from the city of Baguio in the province of Benguet to the municipality of Bauang in the province of La Union.

The 39.114-kilometer (24.304 mi) highway traverses the Benguet municipalities of Tuba and Sablan, and the La Union towns of Burgos, Naguilian, and Bauang.

The highway serves as a major access route to Baguio. It is primarily used by motorists coming from the port city of San Fernando as well as the northern provinces of the Ilocos Region to get to the city.

Although Quirino Highway is the official name of the road, most people are more used to calling it by its former name. It is also a component of National Route 54 (N54) of the Philippine highway network, where Kennon Road also belongs.

== History ==
Naguilian Road, as it was once known, was the first and only road connecting the city to the lowlands, until Kennon Road was completed in 1905. It formed part of Highway 9 especially during the American colonial era. The highway was renamed into "President Elpidio Quirino Highway", in honor of former Philippine President Elpidio Quirino.

== Intersections ==
Intersections are numbered by kilometer posts, with Rizal Park in Manila designated as kilometer zero.

| Province | City/Municipality | km | mi | Destinations | Notes |
|---|---|---|---|---|---|
| Benguet | Baguio | | | Abanao Road / Shuntug Road | Eastern terminus. |
| Benguet | Baguio | | | Camp Henry T. Allen Road | |
| Benguet | Baguio | | | F. Yandoc Street | |
| Benguet | Baguio | | | Buhagan Road (Bokawkan Road) — La Trinidad, Tuba, Tublay | |
| Benguet | Baguio | | | Sixto Gaerlan Street | |
| Benguet | Baguio | | | Ferguson Road | Access to Guisad area & Tam-awan Village. |
| Benguet | Baguio | | | Escoda Street / Hamada Road | No entry to Hamada Road from Naguilian Road. |
| Benguet | Baguio | | | Pilar Hidalgo Lim Road | Access to Quezon Hill Proper, Igorot Stone Kingdom & Tam-awan Village. |
| Benguet | Baguio | | | Dominican Hill Road | Access to Our Lady of Lourdes Grotto & Diplomat Hotel. |
| Benguet | Baguio | | | San Roque Road | No entry from Naguilian Road. |
| Benguet | Baguio | | | Lt. J. Artiaga Street | Short access road to Pilar Hidalgo Lim Road. |
| Benguet | Baguio | | | Sofia de Veyra Street | Short access road to Pilar Hidalgo Lim Road. |
| Benguet | Baguio | | | Baguio Cemetery Road | Baguio Public Cemetery. |
| Benguet | Baguio | | | N234 (Asin–Nangalisan–San Pascual Road) – Tuba, Pugo | |
| Benguet | Baguio | | | San Carlos Heights Road | |
| Benguet | Baguio | | | Saint Patrick Road | |
| Benguet | Baguio | | | N233 (Munoz Drive) | Alternate access to N234 (Asin–Nangalisan–San Pascual Road). |
| Benguet | Baguio | | | Add Road | |
| Benguet | Baguio | | | Agro Road | |
| Benguet | Baguio | | | Cypress Road | |
| Benguet | Baguio | | | Tengdow Road | Access to New Irisan Barangay Hall & Philippine Science High School CAR Campus. |
| Benguet | Baguio | | | Balenben Road | |
| Benguet | Baguio | | | Bernardo Calatan Street | |
| Benguet | Baguio | | | F. Luna Drive | |
| Benguet | Baguio | | | Luna Street | |
| Benguet | Baguio | | | Conon Street | |
| Benguet | Baguio | | | Mang-os Road | |
| Benguet | Baguio | | | Cutay Road | |
| Benguet | Baguio | | | Osio Road / Catalino Drive | |
| Benguet | La Trinidad – Baguio – Tuba boundary | | | Longlong Road (Pico–Lamtang Road) | |
| Benguet | Sablan | | | Calot–Kamog–Pappa Road | |
| Benguet | Sablan | | | Monglo–Bayabas Provincial Road | Access to Asin–Nangalisan–San Pascual Road. |
| Benguet | Sablan | | | Sawili–Alimang Road | |
| La Union | Burgos | | | Bilis–Tumapoc Road | |
| La Union | Naguilian | | | Texas Road | |
| La Union | Naguilian | | | Imelda–Bariquir–Lioac Norte Road | |
| La Union | Naguilian | | | Naguilian–Bagulin Road — Bagulin, San Fernando | Ends at downtown San Fernando City at F. Ortega Highway. |
| La Union | Naguilian | | | E. Rimando Street (Baraoas Road) | |
| La Union | Bauang | | | Bauang-San Fernando-San Juan Bypass Road | Under construction. |
| La Union | Bauang | | | Rebollos Street | |
| La Union | Bauang | | | Antonio Luna Street | |
| La Union | Bauang | | | Nera Street | |
| La Union | Bauang | | | N2 (Manila North Road) – San Fernando, Vigan, Agoo, Manila | Western terminus. Northbound goes to San Fernando, Ilocos Norte and Ilocos Sur; southbound goes to Agoo, Pangasinan, and Manila. |
1.000 mi = 1.609 km; 1.000 km = 0.621 mi: Incomplete access; Unopened
