= List of Forevermore episodes =

Forevermore was a 2014 Philippine romantic drama television series directed by Cathy Garcia-Molina, starring Enrique Gil and Liza Soberano, together with an ensemble cast. The series was aired on ABS-CBN and worldwide on The Filipino Channel from October 27, 2014, to May 22, 2015, replacing Ikaw Lamang.

This is the story of Xander (Enrique Gil), the rebellious and broken unico hijo of a hotel magnate; and Agnes (Liza Soberano), the humble and hardworking daughter of a strawberry farmer in Benguet. Both cross paths when Xander crashes into Agnes's strawberry truck while base jumping. After the incident, his parents make him pay for the damages and his recklessness by having him work in the strawberry farm without any comfortable amenities, under the guidance of Agnes and her strawberry farm community. The journey towards Xander's immersion in a totally different world was not easy for both. However, eventually, Xander, with the help of Agnes and their community, will transform from a brash, broken boy to a very charming man loved by everyone.

The series ended with a total number of 148 episodes.

== Series overview ==
Season	Episodes	Originally aired	
Season	Episodes	First aired	Last aired
1	74	October 27, 2014	February 5, 2015
2	74	February 6, 2015	May 22, 2015

== Episodes ==
=== Book 1 ===
Episode No.	Title	Date Aired
1	"Forevermore Begins"	October 27, 2014
2	"Trap"	October 28, 2014
3	"Runaway"	October 29, 2014
4	"Tied"	October 30, 2014
5	"Deal"	October 31, 2014
6	"Challenge"	November 3, 2014
7	"Square One"	November 4, 2014
8	"Idle Hands"	November 5, 2014
9	"Guilt Trip"	November 6, 2014
10	"Mr. Congeniality"	November 7, 2014
11	"Damsel In Distress"	November 10, 2014
12	"Step Up"	November 11, 2014
13	"Strawberia Festival"	November 12, 2014
14	"Run Xander Run"	November 13, 2014
15	"Kapit Lang"	November 14, 2014
16	"Sorry Na Pwede Ba"	November 17, 2014
17	"Throwback"	November 18, 2014
18	"Turn Around"	November 19, 2014
19	"Lost"	November 20, 2014
20	"Awit Ni Agnes"	November 21, 2014
21	"Let It Go"	November 24, 2014
22	"Confession"	November 25, 2014
23	"Unexpected"	November 26, 2014
24	"LaPresaPalooza"	November 27, 2014
25	"Torn"	November 28, 2014
26	"Parting Time"	December 1, 2014
27	"Missing"	December 2, 2014
28	"Aftershock"	December 3, 2014
29	"Superman"	December 4, 2014
30	"The Big Reveal"	December 5, 2014
31	"Do The Moves"	December 8, 2014
32	"The Grande Bash"	December 9, 2014
33	"The Comeback"	December 10, 2014
34	"The Threat"	December 11, 2014
35	"FJ and PJ"	December 12, 2014
36	"Flashback"	December 15, 2014
37	"Never Ever"	December 16, 2014
38	"The Preparation"	December 17, 2014
39	"A Night To Remember"	December 18, 2014
40	"Meet The Grandes"	December 19, 2014
41	"The Agnes Test"	December 22, 2014
42	"The Grande Scholar"	December 23, 2014
43	"Paskong Grande"	December 24, 2014
44	"Paskong La Presa"	December 25, 2014
45	"Sepanx"	December 26, 2014
46	"The Challenge"	December 29, 2014
47	"Strawberry Queen"	December 30, 2014
48	"The Stand"	December 31, 2014
49	"Pasabog"	January 1, 2015
50	"The Decision"	January 2, 2015
51	"The Face Of Grande"	January 5, 2015
52	"For Sale"	January 6, 2015
53	"Selosa"	January 7, 2015
54	"Change Of Heart"	January 8, 2015
55	"Halaga"	January 9, 2015
56	"Through The Fire"	January 12, 2015
57	"Finding Kate"	January 13, 2015
58	"Trust"	January 14, 2015
59	"Tiis Ganda"	January 15, 2015
60	"Choice"	January 16, 2015
61	"Bawi"	January 19, 2015
62	"First Date"	January 20, 2015
63	"Monthsary"	January 21, 2015
64	"Keep Calm"	January 22, 2015
65	"Bring It On"	January 23, 2015
66	"Tension"	January 26, 2015
67	"Double Cross"	January 27, 2015
68	"Hold On"	January 28, 2015
69	"Struggle"	January 29, 2015
70	"Matira Matibay"	January 30, 2015
71	"Fight"	February 2, 2015
72	"For The Love"	February 3, 2015
73	"Change"	February 4, 2015
74	"New Beginning"	February 5, 2015

=== Book 2 ===
Episode No.	Title	Date Aired
75	"Something New"	February 6, 2015
76	"Finding Xander"	February 9, 2015
77	"Superman Returns"	February 10, 2015
78	"The Call"	February 11, 2015
79	"Comeback"	February 12, 2015
80	"Moment"	February 13, 2015
81	"Time Machine"	February 16, 2015
82	"If Only"	February 17, 2015
83	"Encounter"	February 18, 2015
84	"Pagsuyo"	February 19, 2015
85	"Reach Out"	February 20, 2015
86	"Try Again"	February 23, 2015
87	"Caught In The Act"	February 24, 2015
88	"Surrender"	February 25, 2015
89	"Finally"	February 26, 2015
90	"This Is It"	February 27, 2015
91	"The Light"	March 2, 2015
92	"Special Day"	March 3, 2015
93	"Turn Back Time"	March 4, 2015
94	"Para-Paraan"	March 5, 2015
95	"Professor X"	March 6, 2015
96	"Awkward"	March 9, 2015
97	"Battle Begins"	March 10, 2015
98	"Pagtapat"	March 11, 2015
99	"Never Give Up"	March 12, 2015
100	"Fight Plan"	March 13, 2015
101	"Double Trouble"	March 16, 2015
102	"Try and Try"	March 17, 2015
103	"Mission Possible"	March 18, 2015
104	"Pusong Lito"	March 19, 2015
105	"Save Our Hearts"	March 20, 2015
106	"Game Of Love"	March 23, 2015
107	"Affected Much"	March 24, 2015
108	"Game Plan"	March 25, 2015
109	"Begin Again"	March 26, 2015
110	"Hope"	March 27, 2015
111	"Reality"	March 30, 2015
112	"Burden"	March 31, 2015
113	"The Return"	April 1, 2015
114	"The Adviser"	April 6, 2015
115	"Consultation 101"	April 7, 2015
116	"The Proposal"	April 8, 2015
117	"Lock In"	April 9, 2015
118	"Deadline"	April 10, 2015
119	"Walk Away"	April 13, 2015
120	"Meet The Grandes 2"	April 14, 2015
121	"Alam Na"	April 15, 2015
122	"Kryptonite"	April 16, 2015
123	"Expo"	April 17, 2015
124	"The Xander Effect"	April 20, 2015
125	"Fall Apart"	April 21, 2015
126	"Waiting Game"	April 22, 2015
127	"Surprise"	April 23, 2015
128	"Answers"	April 24, 2015
129	"Hugot Ni Agnes"	April 27, 2015
130	"Hugot Ni Xander"	April 28, 2015
131	"Durog"	April 29, 2015
132	"Move On"	April 30, 2015
133	"Alex"	May 1, 2015
134	"Guni-Guni"	May 4, 2015
135	"Xander Pa Rin"	May 5, 2015
136	"Ligaw"	May 6, 2015
137	"Tadhana"	May 7, 2015
138	"Pagbabalik Ni Xander"	May 8, 2015
139	"Man Of Steel"	May 11, 2015
140	"Pursuit Of Xander"	May 12, 2015
141	"Kapit Agnes"	May 13, 2015
142	"Business Or Pleasure"	May 14, 2015
143	"When Agnes Meets Alex"	May 15, 2015
144	"Detour"	May 18, 2015
145	"Agnes' Choice"	May 19, 2015
146	"Now Or Never"	May 20, 2015
147	TBA	May 21, 2015
148	"May Forever Ba / Forevermore Finale"	May 22, 2015
