= Asin Road =

Road in Luzon, Philippines

Asin–Nangalisan–San Pascual Road
- Baguio–Tubao Road; Tubao–Asin Road; Asin Road
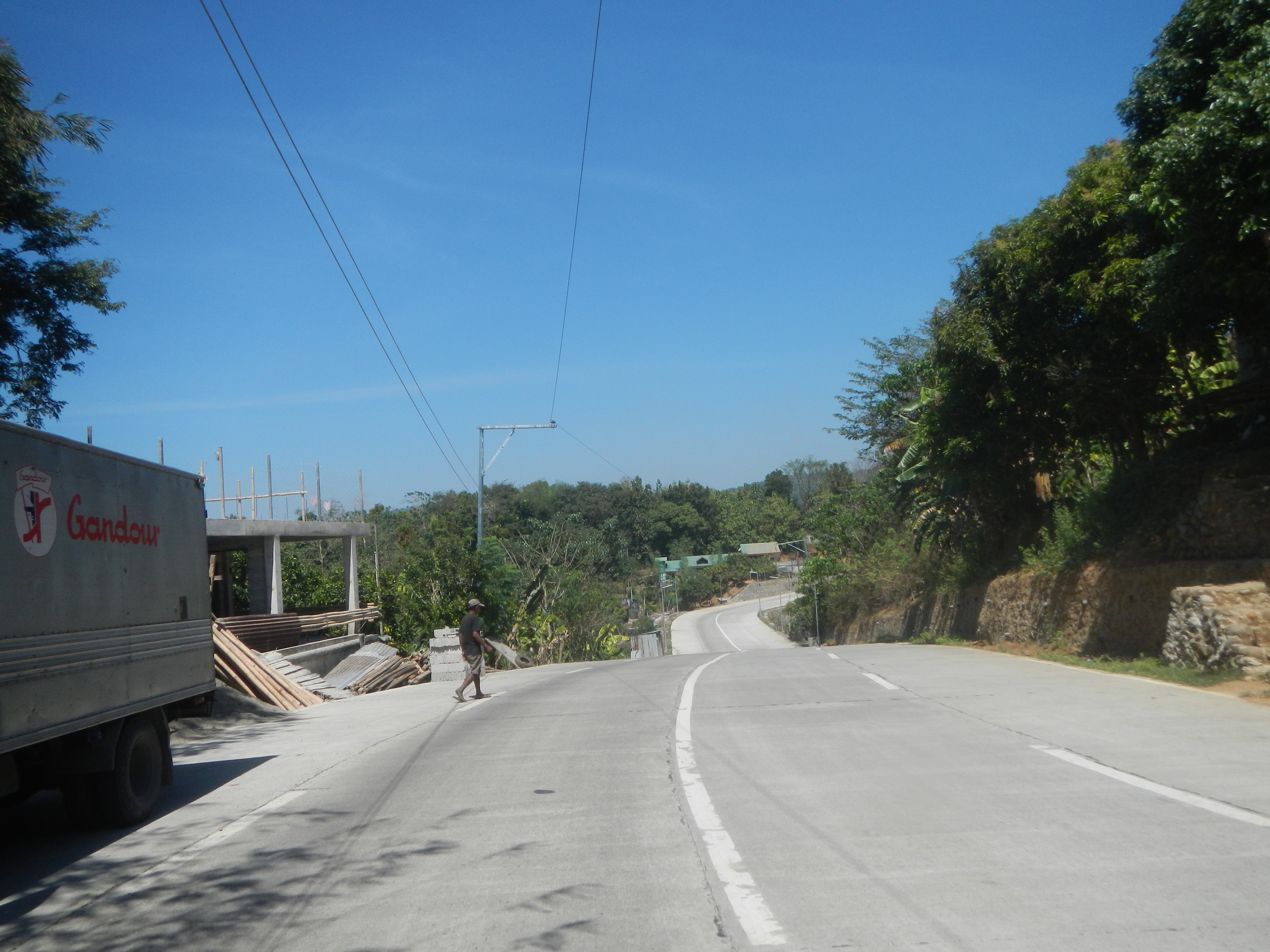
- The Asin-Nangalisan-San Pascual Road in Anduyan, Tubao, La Union

Route information
- Maintained by Department of Public Works and Highways
- Length: 14.0 km (8.7 mi)
- Existed: December 17, 2018–present
- Component highways: N234 in Baguio; N233 in Baguio

Major junctions
- Northeast end: N54 (Naguilian Road) in Baguio
- N233 (Western Link Circumferential Road) in Baguio
- Southwest end: N208 (Aspiras–Palispis Highway) in Tubao, La Union

Location
- Country: Philippines
- Provinces: Benguet, La Union
- Major cities: Baguio
- Towns: Tubao, Pugo, Aringay, Tuba

Highway system
- Roads in the Philippines; Highways; Expressways; List

The Asin–Nangalisan–San Pascual Road (also known as the Baguio–Tubao Road, Tubao–Asin Road or simply, Asin Road (Note: Not to be confused with barangay "Asin Road" of Baguio)) is a major road in La Union and Benguet, Philippines, serving as an alternative route to Baguio. This road is dangerous, and has tunnels along the way which used to be intended for rail services from Aringay to Baguio. The road officially opened to public on December 17, 2018.

The road leads to the Asin Hot Springs in Sitio Asin in Nangalisan, Tuba, Benguet. Other resorts and hotsprings along the way include Pooten's Resort, Palm Grove Hot Springs and Mountains Resort, Riverview Water Park, and Neverland Mountain Resort.

The segment of the road in Baguio forms part of National Route 234 (N234) and National Route 233 (N233) of the Philippine highway network. The rest of the road leading to Tubao, La Union remains unnumbered and classified as a tertiary national road. Recently, due to Marcos Highway suffering heavy traffic, the road was rehabilitated to serve as an alternative route down to La Union, but there are some more adjustments left.

== Route description ==
The Asin–Nangalisan–San Pascual Road serves as an alternative route to Baguio, and is also the fourth that leads to Baguio from the northwestern lowlands of Luzon. The road also helps decongest the traffic in Marcos Highway, despite being slightly longer than the said road.

The road starts at the junction of Marcos Highway (N208) in Tubao, La Union as a four-lane road. Its features have many of the lightning and reflectorized signages and bus terminals. The Anduyan Bridge, which spans 360 meters (1,180 ft), carries along the route. After crossing the span, the road is narrowed to two lanes (one per direction) upon traversing the higher elevation that contains sharp curves and steep elevation upon entering Benguet province.

== Intersections ==
Intersections are numbered by kilometer posts, with Rizal Park in Manila designated as kilometer zero. Some intersections are also marked by their relative distance from Baguio's kilometer zero, located in the city's Plaza Garden.

Region	Province	City/Municipality	km	mi	Destinations	Notes
Cordillera Administrative Region	Benguet	Baguio	304.5	189.2	N54 (Naguilian Road (Quirino Highway)) – Baguio, Bauang	Eastern terminus.
Cordillera Administrative Region	Benguet	Baguio	283	176	Jared Pine Bend	Route number change from N234 to N233.
Cordillera Administrative Region	Benguet	Baguio	307	191	Muñoz Drive	Also known as KM4 Asin Road. End of N233 concurrency.
Cordillera Administrative Region	Benguet	Baguio	310	190	F2 Cutay Road	
Cordillera Administrative Region	Benguet	Baguio-Tuba boundary	308.5	191.7		
Cordillera Administrative Region	Benguet	Tuba	266	165	Asin Tunnel 1	
Cordillera Administrative Region	Benguet	Tuba	267	166	Asin Tunnel 2	
Cordillera Administrative Region	Benguet	Tuba	275	171	Baguio-La Trinidad-Itogon-Sablan-Tuba-Tublay (BLISTT) Outer Ring Circumferential Road	Also known as Nangalisan Junction.
Cordillera Administrative Region-Ilocos Region boundary	La Union–Benguet boundary	Tuba-Aringay boundary	282	175		
Ilocos Region	La Union	Aringay			Taloy-Bacsayan Provincial Road	
Ilocos Region	La Union	Aringay-Pugo boundary				
Ilocos Region	La Union	Pugo			Anduyan Bridge over Aringay River	
Ilocos Region	La Union	Pugo-Tubao boundary				
Ilocos Region	La Union	Tubao	246	153	N208 (Aspiras–Palispis Highway) – Agoo, Baguio	Western terminus.
1.000 mi = 1.609 km; 1.000 km = 0.621 mi: Closed/former; Concurrency terminus; Incomplete access; Route transition
