= Tuba, Benguet =

Municipality in Benguet, Philippines

Tuba
- Municipality
- Municipality of Tuba
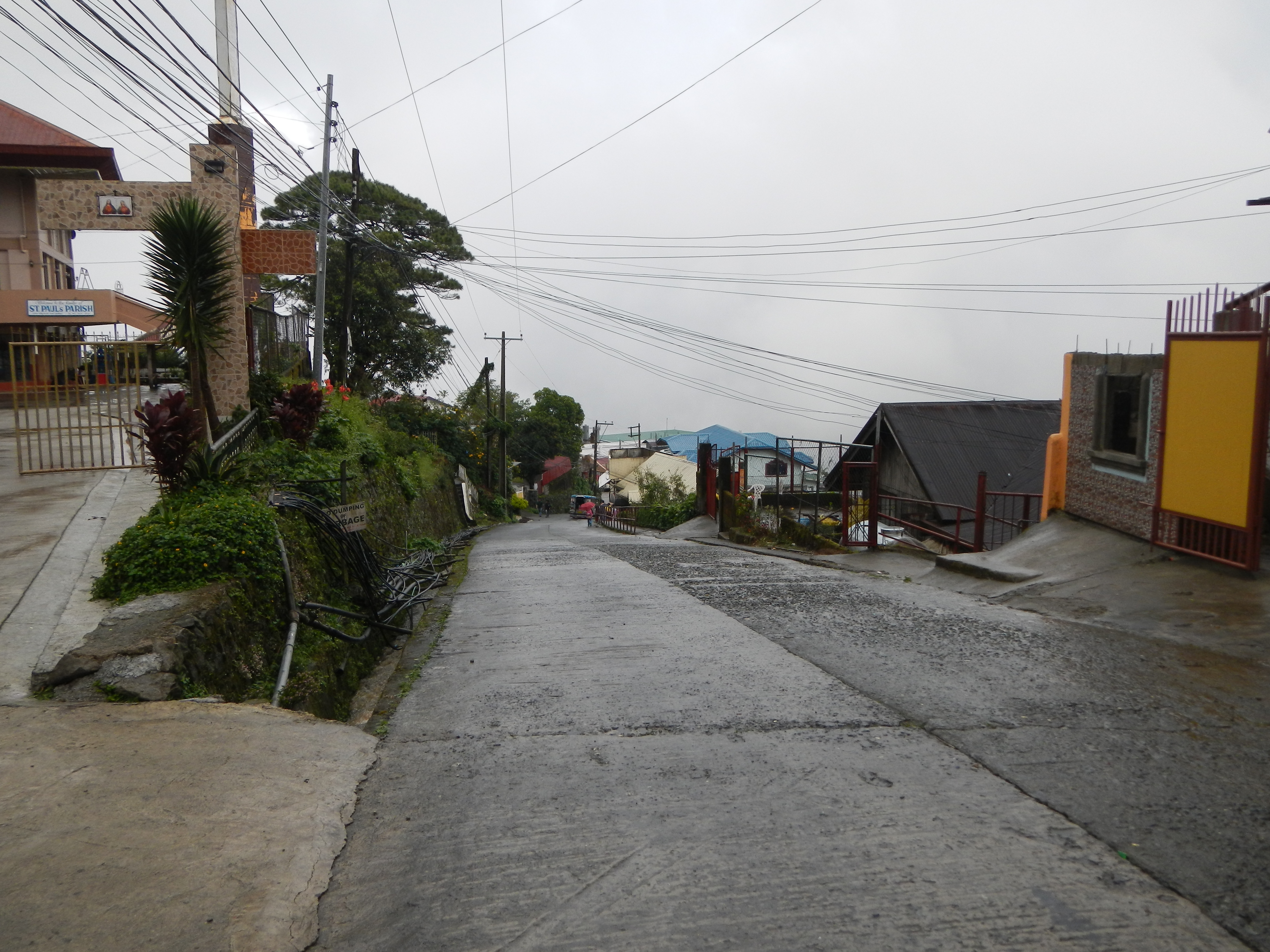
- Poblacion

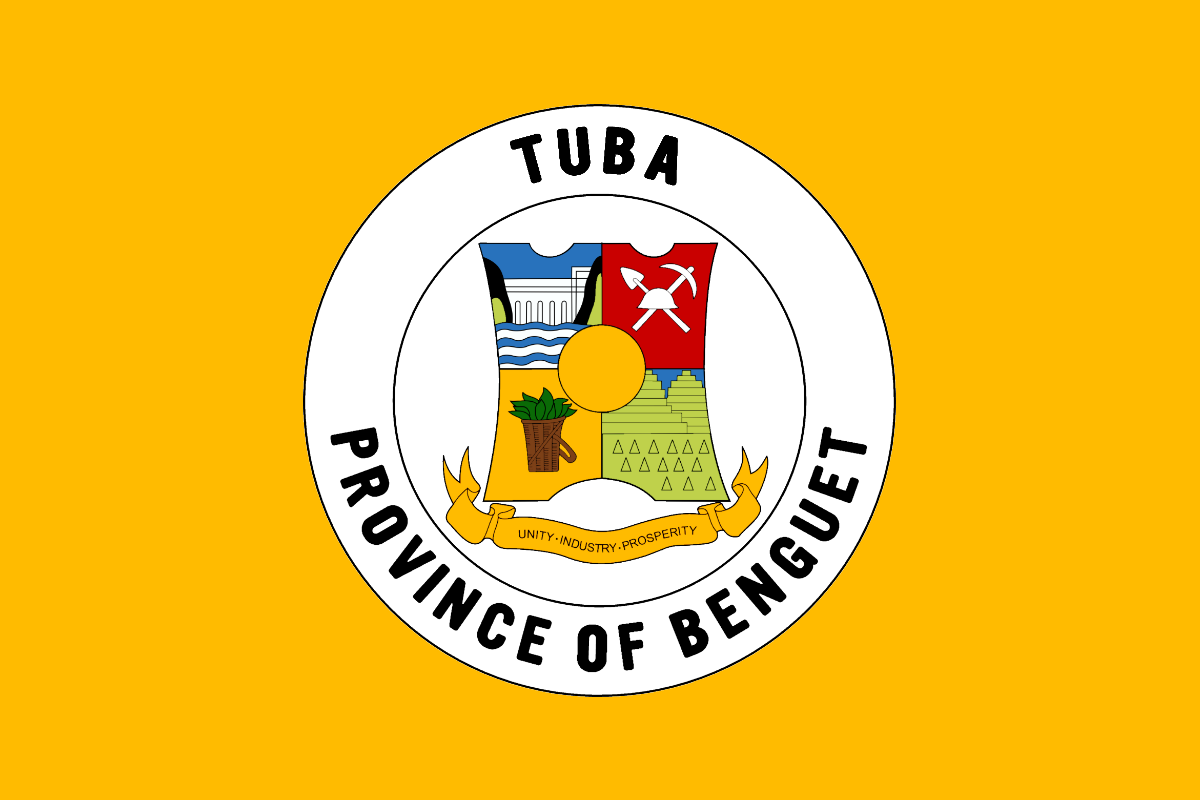
- Flag Seal
- Nickname: Gateway to Baguio
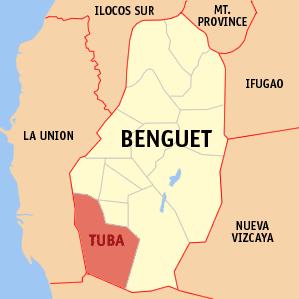
- Map of Benguet with Tuba highlighted
- Interactive map of Tuba
- Location within the Philippines
- Coordinates: 16°23′34″N 120°33′37″E
- Country: Philippines
- Region: Cordillera Administrative Region
- Province: Benguet
- District: Lone district
- Founded: 1911
- Barangays: 13 (see Barangays)

Government
  - Type: Sangguniang Bayan
  - Mayor: Clarita P. Sal-ongan
  - Vice Mayor: Maria L. Carantes
  - Representative: Eric Go Yap
  - Municipal Council: Members: Eugene M. Gabino; Garey G. Behis; William D. Abance; Reachelle C. Takinan; Nestor L. Baban; Rebecca Y. Apil; Jerome S. Palaoag; Arnulfo D. Milo
  - Electorate: 26,532 voters (2025)

Area
  - Total: 295.97 km^{2} (114.27 sq mi)
- Elevation: 1,244 m (4,081 ft)
- Highest elevation: 2,030 m (6,660 ft)
- Lowest elevation: 404 m (1,325 ft)

Population (2024 census)
  - Total: 49,268
  - Density: 166.46/km^{2} (431.14/sq mi)
  - Households: 12,004

Economy
  - Income class: 1st municipal income class
  - Poverty incidence: 6.81% (2015)
  - Revenue: ₱ 314.6 million (2024)
  - Assets: ₱ 1,286 million (2024)
  - Expenditure: ₱ 316.6 million (2024)
  - Liabilities: ₱ 115.1 million (2024)

Service provider
  - Electricity: Benguet Electric Cooperative (BENECO)
- Time zone: UTC+8 (PST)
- ZIP code: 2603
- PSGC: 1401113000
- IDD : area code: +63 (0)74
- Native languages: Kankanaey; Ibaloi; Ilocano; Tagalog
- Website: www.tuba.gov.ph

Tuba, officially the Municipality of Tuba (Ilocano: Ili ti Tuba; Tagalog: Bayan ng Tuba), is a municipality in the province of Benguet, Philippines. According to the 2024 census, it has a population of 49,268 people.

Tuba is known as the "Gateway to Baguio", as the Asin–Nangalisan–San Pascual Road, Ben Palispis Highway or Marcos Highway, Kennon Road and Naguilian Road, four access highways of the adjacent city of Baguio, traverse the municipality.

== History ==
Tuba was originally a barrio of the township of Baguio in the early 1900s under the American colonial period. It was separated from Baguio upon the latter's conversion into a chartered city on September 1, 1909, and became part of the township of Twin Peaks in Benguet.

Twin Peaks was abolished as a township on December 11, 1911, with the issuance of Executive Order No. 77 by American Governor General William Cameron Forbes, creating the township of Tuba.

On June 25, 1963, President Diosdado Macapagal issued Executive Order No. 42 and by operation of Section 2 of Republic Act No. 1515, the municipal District of Tuba was converted into a regular municipality. Its first mayor was Wakat Suello.

== Geography ==
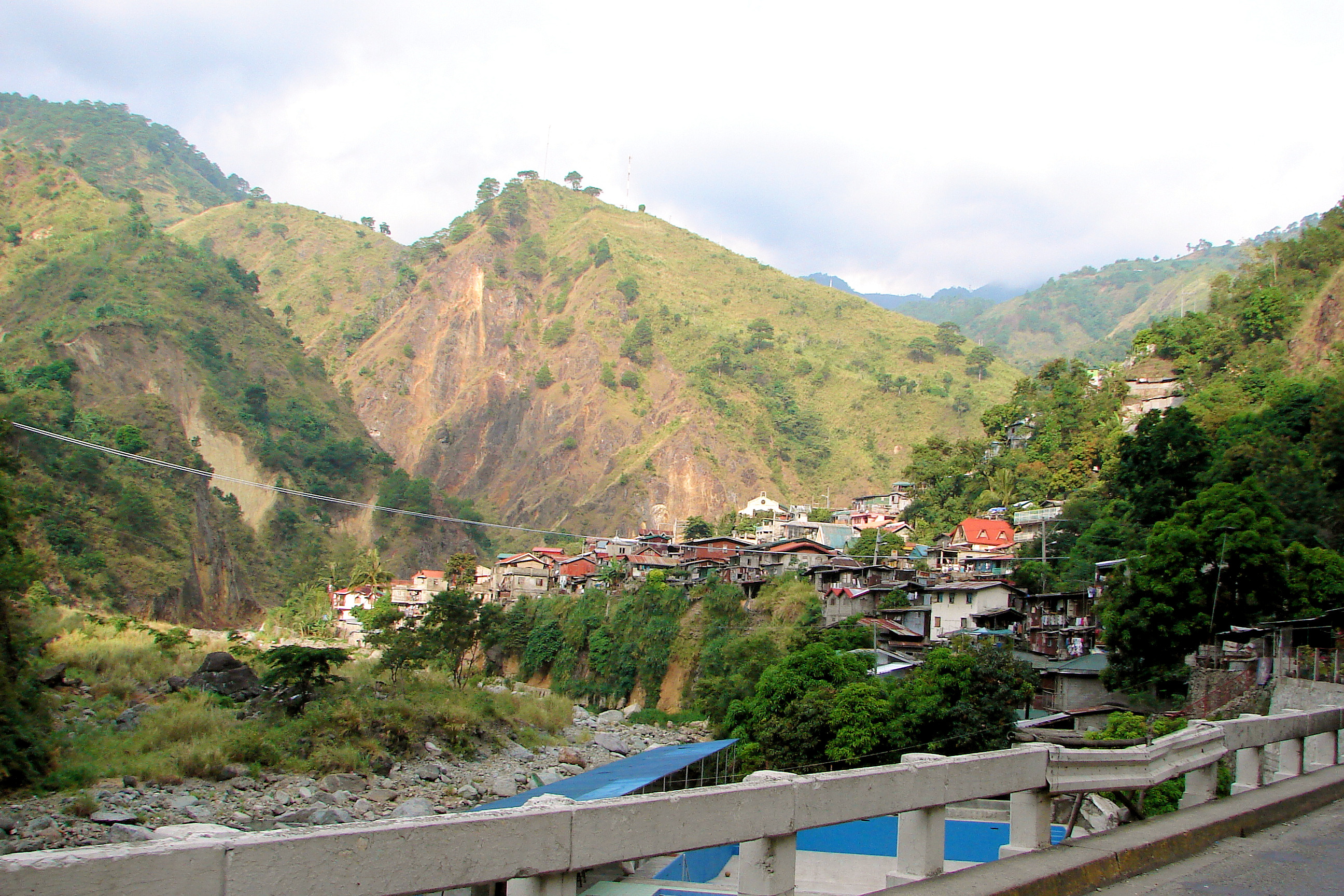
Camp 6 along Kennon Road

The Municipality of Tuba is at the south-western tip of both Benguet and the Central Cordillera Mountain Range. South of the municipality lies the province of Pangasinan and to the west lies the Ilocos rolling hills of the province of La Union. It is bordered on the north by Sablan and La Trinidad; east by Baguio and Itogon; and south by Sison and San Manuel.

According to the Philippine Statistics Authority, the municipality has a land area of 295.97 square kilometres (114.27 sq mi) constituting 10.69% of the 2,769.08-square-kilometre- (1,069.15 sq mi) total area of Benguet. The municipality's urban area comprises the barangays of Poblacion and Camp 3, having a composite land area of 83.85 square kilometres (32.37 sq mi), or 19.31% of the total land area.

Tuba is situated 12.64 kilometres (7.85 mi) from the provincial capital La Trinidad, and 254.20 kilometres (157.95 mi) from the country's capital city of Manila.

=== Topography ===
Tuba's topography is generally characterized by irregular rugged terrain and steep slopes with several mountain peaks rising from the table land itself. Mount Santo Tomas, the highest peak in the municipality soars to 2,252 metres (7,388 ft) above sea level.

Four major rivers/streams and 49 tributary/minor rivers and creeks intersect the landform and serve as the drains of the municipality.

=== Barangays ===
Tuba is politically subdivided into 13 barangays. Each barangay consists of puroks and some have sitios.

PSGC	Barangay	Population			±% p.a.	
		2024		2010		
141113001	Ansagan	4.7%	2,307	2,083	▴	0.71%
141113003	Camp 3	16.0%	7,890	10,413	▾	−1.89%
141113004	Camp 4	13.9%	6,836	5,973	▴	0.93%
141113002	Camp One	3.3%	1,619	1,742	▾	−0.50%
141113006	Nangalisan	5.7%	2,803	2,428	▴	0.99%
141113007	Poblacion	17.4%	8,558	5,958	▴	2.53%
141113008	San Pascual	2.4%	1,201	1,080	▴	0.73%
141113009	Tabaan Norte	2.6%	1,292	1,133	▴	0.91%
141113010	Tabaan Sur	2.8%	1,375	1,264	▴	0.58%
141113011	Tadiangan	17.0%	8,358	5,685	▴	2.69%
141113012	Taloy Norte	3.0%	1,490	1,307	▴	0.91%
141113013	Taloy Sur	7.1%	3,522	2,681	▴	1.90%
141113014	Twin Peaks	2.2%	1,061	1,127	▾	−0.41%
	Total		49,268	48,312	▴	0.14%

=== Climate ===
Climate data for Tuba, Benguet
Month	Jan	Feb	Mar	Apr	May	Jun	Jul	Aug	Sep	Oct	Nov	Dec	Year
Mean daily maximum °C (°F)	23 (73)	24 (75)	26 (79)	27 (81)	25 (77)	24 (75)	23 (73)	22 (72)	23 (73)	24 (75)	24 (75)	24 (75)	24 (75)
Mean daily minimum °C (°F)	13 (55)	14 (57)	15 (59)	17 (63)	18 (64)	18 (64)	18 (64)	18 (64)	17 (63)	16 (61)	15 (59)	14 (57)	16 (61)
Average precipitation mm (inches)	15 (0.6)	16 (0.6)	24 (0.9)	33 (1.3)	102 (4.0)	121 (4.8)	177 (7.0)	165 (6.5)	144 (5.7)	170 (6.7)	56 (2.2)	23 (0.9)	1,046 (41.2)
Average rainy days	6.3	6.6	9.5	12.8	20.6	23.5	25.4	23.4	23.2	21.4	14.0	8.2	194.9
Source: Meteoblue

Tuba has 2 pronounced seasons - wet and dry. The dry season starts in November and lasts until April while the wet season lasts from May to October.

== Demographics ==
Population census of Tuba
Year	Pop.	±% p.a.
1918	2,764	—
1939	5,936	+3.71%
1948	4,888	−2.14%
1960	9,307	+5.51%
1970	17,939	+6.77%
1975	25,304	+7.14%
1980	30,449	+3.77%
1990	39,635	+2.67%
1995	39,589	−0.02%
2000	38,366	−0.67%
2007	40,008	+0.58%
2010	42,874	+2.55%
2015	47,648	+2.03%
2020	48,312	+0.29%
2024	49,268	+0.47%
Source: Philippine Statistics Authority

In the 2024 census, Tuba had a population of 49,268 people. The population density was 170 inhabitants per square kilometre (440/sq mi).

== Economy ==
Poverty incidence of Tuba (%)

Source: Philippine Statistics Authority

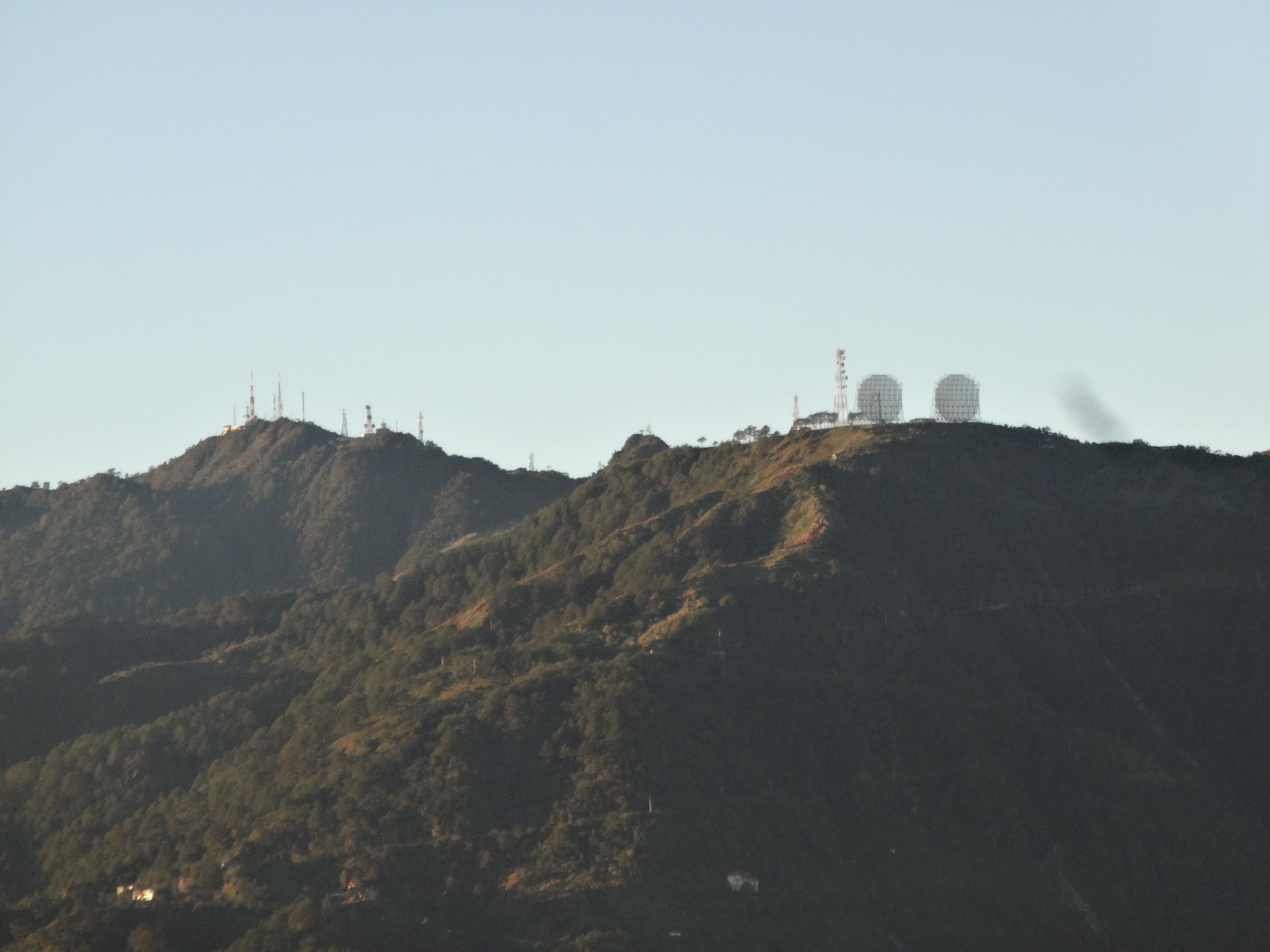
Twin peaks of Mount Cabuyao (right, foreground) and the higher Mount Santo Tomas (left, background)

Mining is a major part of the economy of Tuba. The town's mining industry began upon the discovery of gold in the province of Benguet during the early 1930s. Since 1958, Philex Mining Corporation, the largest gold and copper producer in the Philippines, has been operating the first underground block cave mine in the Far East at Padcal in Barangay Camp 3.

Tailings from the copper and gold mines have wreaked havoc on the local environment: the Bued River, which runs through Tuba, is heavily silted and requires frequent dredging.

A few abandoned mining sites such as those of Benguet Exploration Mine and Black Mountain, Inc. have been left unattended for years, which pose a threat to the local population and the environment.

The presence of waterfalls, hot springs and natural caves in the municipality boosts tourism. Mount Cabuyao and Mount Santo Tomas, the highest mountain in the town, are frequently visited by mountaineers.

DMCI Homes Leisure Residences is building a P6 billion "Moncello Crest", a new condo hotel mountain resort project with initial 522 units in its 'Blanca' offered, in Tuba in Benguet.

== Government ==
=== Local government ===
Tuba, belonging to the lone congressional district of the province of Benguet, is governed by a mayor designated as its local chief executive and by a municipal council as its legislative body in accordance with the Local Government Code. The mayor, vice mayor, and the councilors are elected directly by the people through an election which is being held every three years.

=== Elected officials ===
Members of the Municipal Council (2025-2028)
Position	Name
Congressman	Eric G. Yap
Mayor	Clarita P. Sal-ongan
Vice-Mayor	Maria L. Carantes
Councilors	Eugene M. Gabino
Councilors	Garey G. Behis
Councilors	William D. Abance
Councilors	Reachelle C. Takinan
Councilors	Nestor L. Baban
Councilors	Rebecca Y. Apil
Councilors	Jerome S. Palaoag
Councilors	Arnulfo D. Milo

== Transportation ==
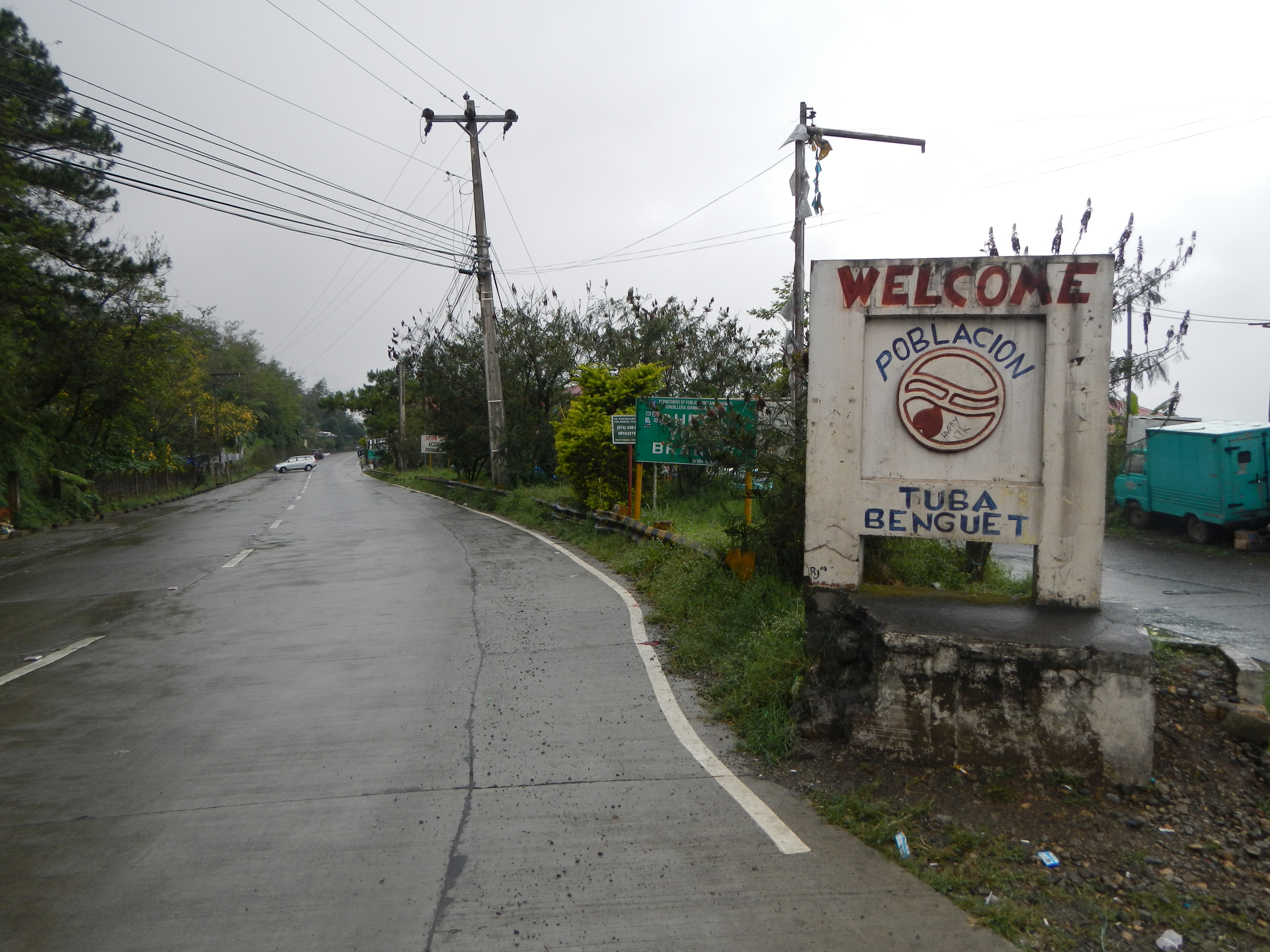
Marcos Highway at Poblacion

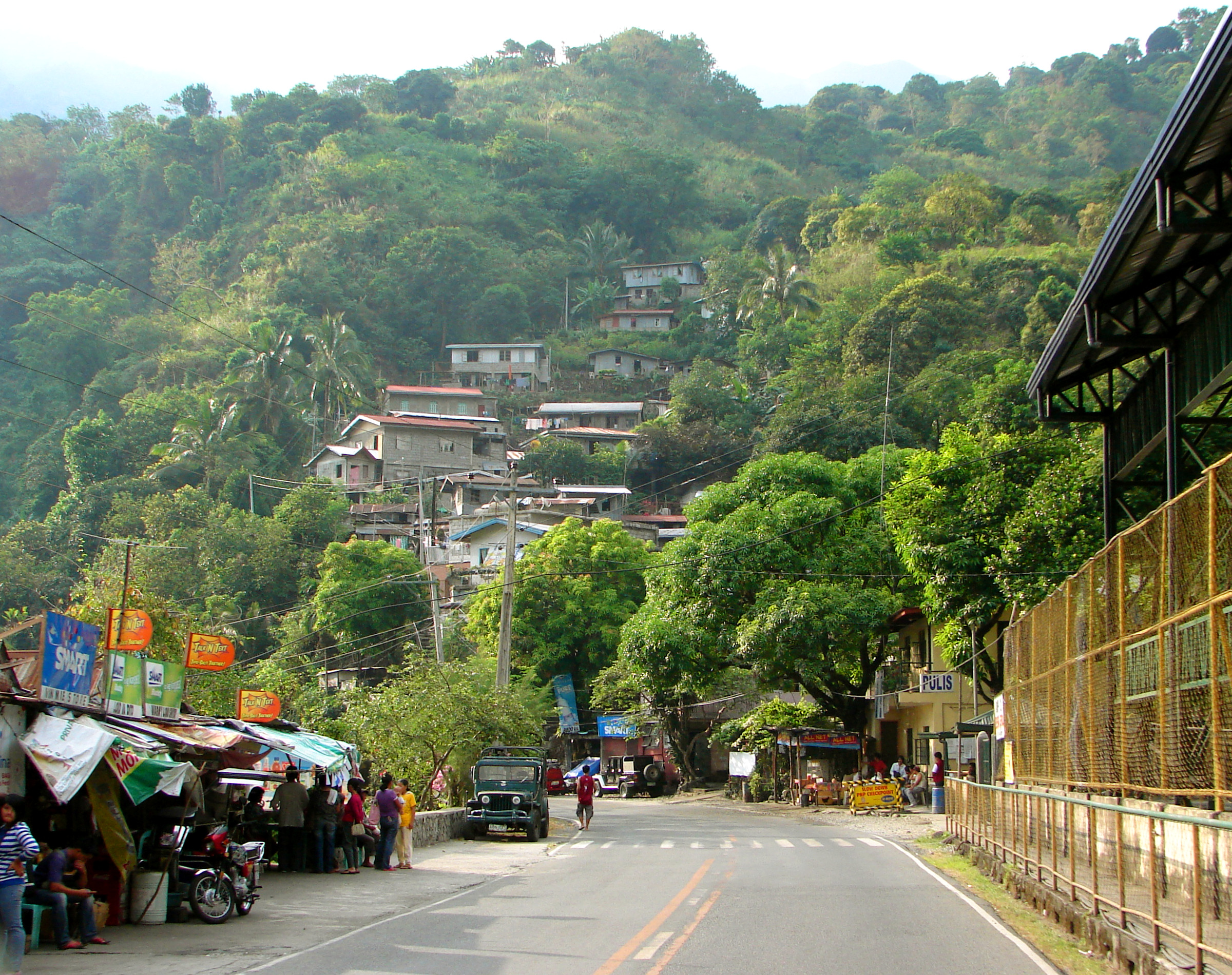
Kennon Road at Camp 3

The four major highways that connect the lowlands to Baguio pass through the municipality.

Highway	Barangays traversed (downhill from Baguio)
Kennon Road	Camp 4; Camp 3; Camp One; Twin Peaks
Aspiras-Palispis Highway	Poblacion; Taloy Norte; Taloy Sur
Naguilian Road	Tadiangan; Nangalisan
Asin–Nangalisan–San Pascual Road	Nangalisan; San Pascual

== Education ==
The Tuba Schools District Office governs all educational institutions within the municipality. It oversees the management and operations of all private and public, from primary to secondary schools.

=== Public schools ===
As of 2014, Tuba has 32 public elementary schools and 6 public secondary schools.

Elementary (2013-2014)
School	Barangay
Andolor Primary School	Tabaan Sur
Asin Elementary School	Nangalisan
Batuan Elementary School	Nangalisan
Besong-Saddle Primary School	Poblacion
Camp 3 Elementary School	Camp 3
Camp 4 Elementary School	Camp 4
Camp 6 Elementary School	Camp 4 (official)
Gavino Palaoag Elementary School	Twin Peaks
Gilbert Semon Elementary School	Tadiangan
Indaoac Elementary School	Tabaan Sur
Kabuyao Elementary School	Poblacion
Kiwas Elementary School	Tadiangan
Klondykes Elementary School	Camp One
Labney Primary School	Ansagan
Ligay Elementary School	Camp One
Lubas Elementary School	Ansagan
Mariano Sabarino Elementary School	Taloy Norte
Miguel Palispis Elementary School	Tabaan Norte
Nangalisan Elementary School	Nangalisan
Paran Laruan Elementary School	Camp One
Piminggan Elementary School	Ansagan
Poyopoy Elementary School	Taloy Sur
Saguitlang Elementary School	Ansagan
Salpang Elementary School	Taloy Sur
San Pascual Elementary School	San Pascual
Sioco Cariño Elementary School	Ansagan
Taloy Norte Elementary School	Taloy Norte
Taloy Sur Elementary School	Taloy Sur
Torre Elementary School	Camp 3
Toybongan Elementary School	Tabaan Norte
Tuba Central School	Poblacion
Yagyagan Elementary School	Tadiangan

Secondary (2013-2014)
School	Barangay
Evelio Javier Memorial National High School	Camp 4 (official)
Evelio Memorial National High School - Annex	Ansagan
Taloy Sur National High School	Taloy Sur
Tuba Central National High School	Poblacion
Tuba National High School	Nangalisan
Twin Peaks National High School	Twin Peaks

== Gallery ==
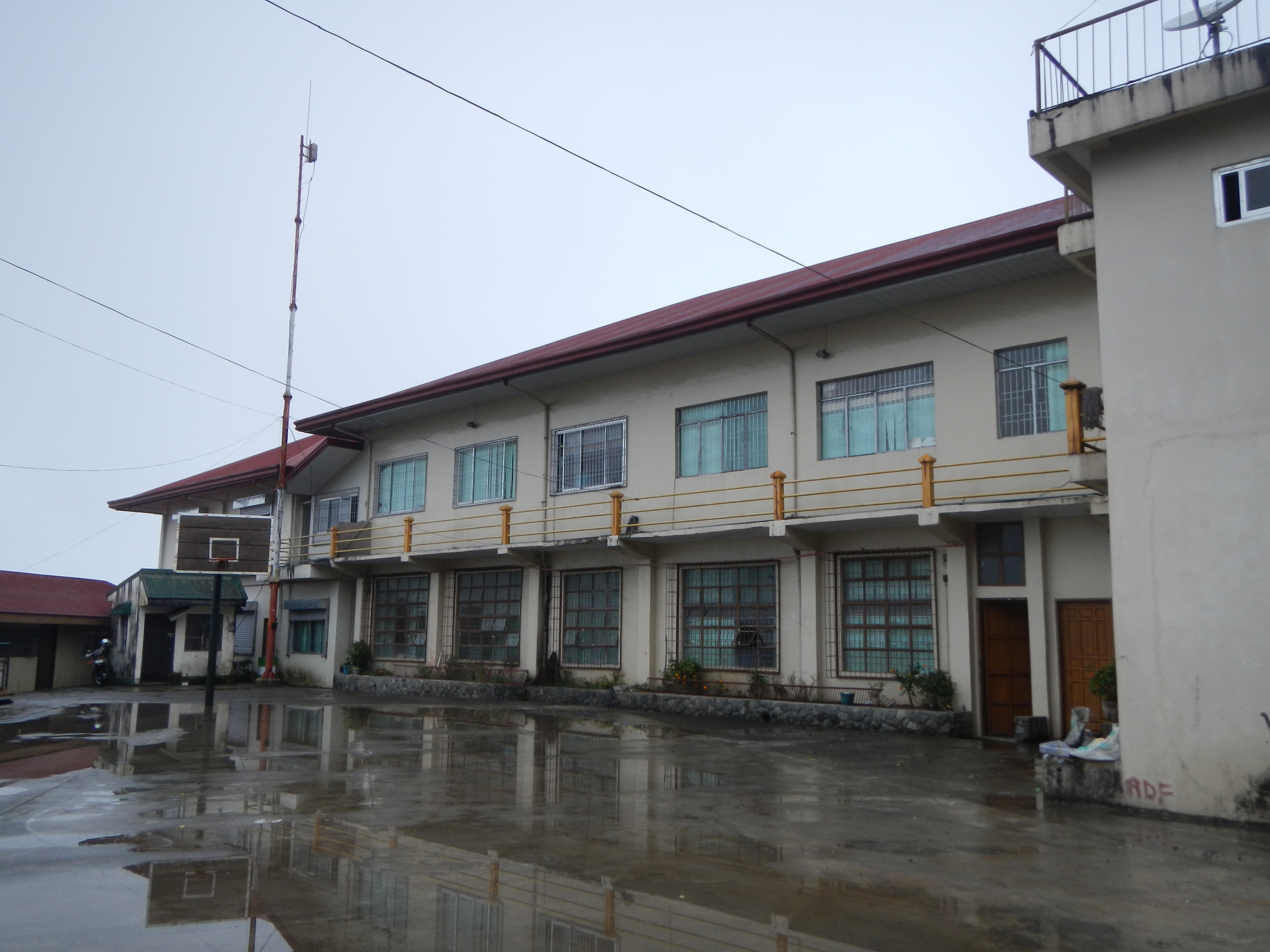
Municipal hall

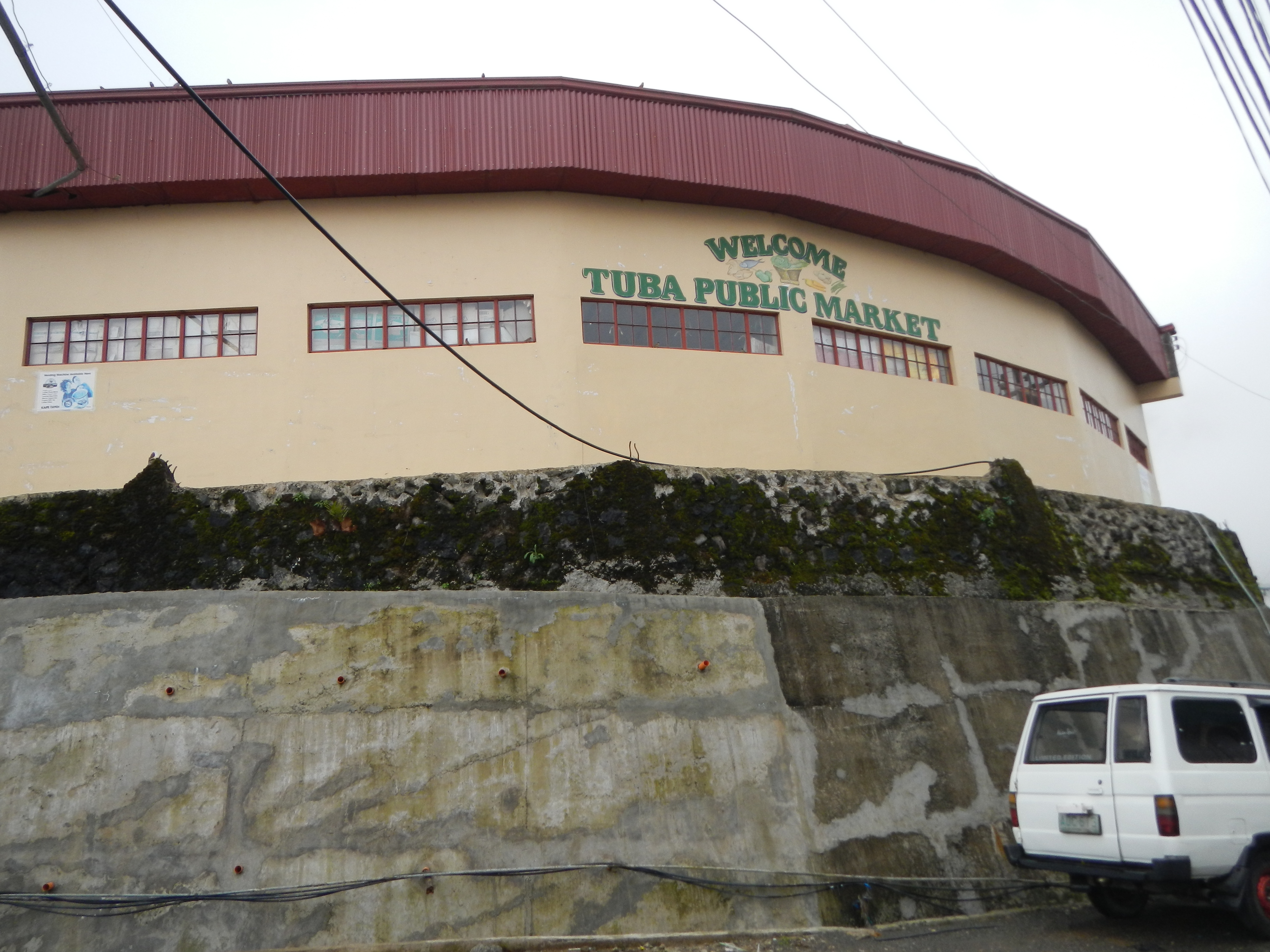
Public market

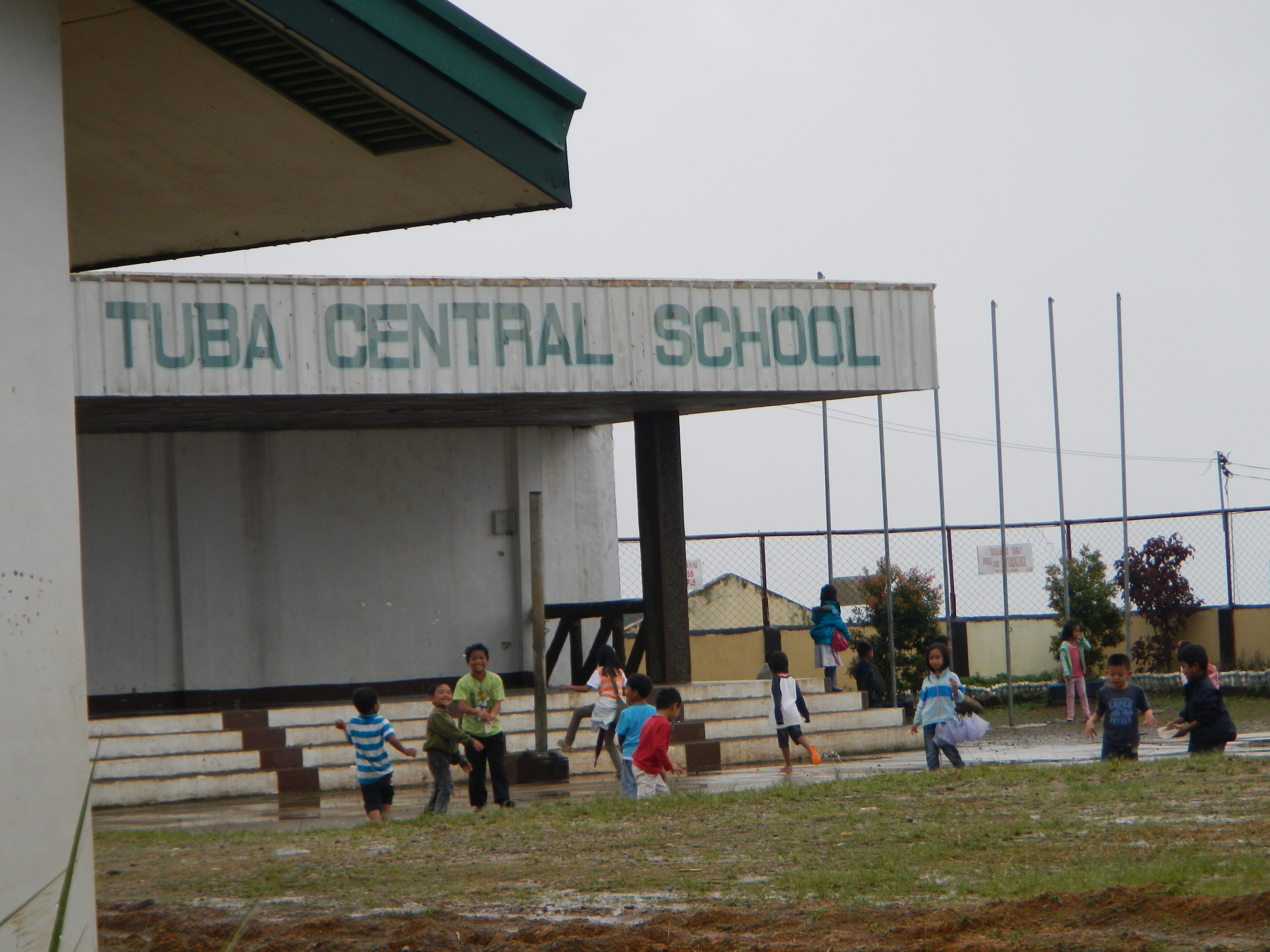
Tuba Central School

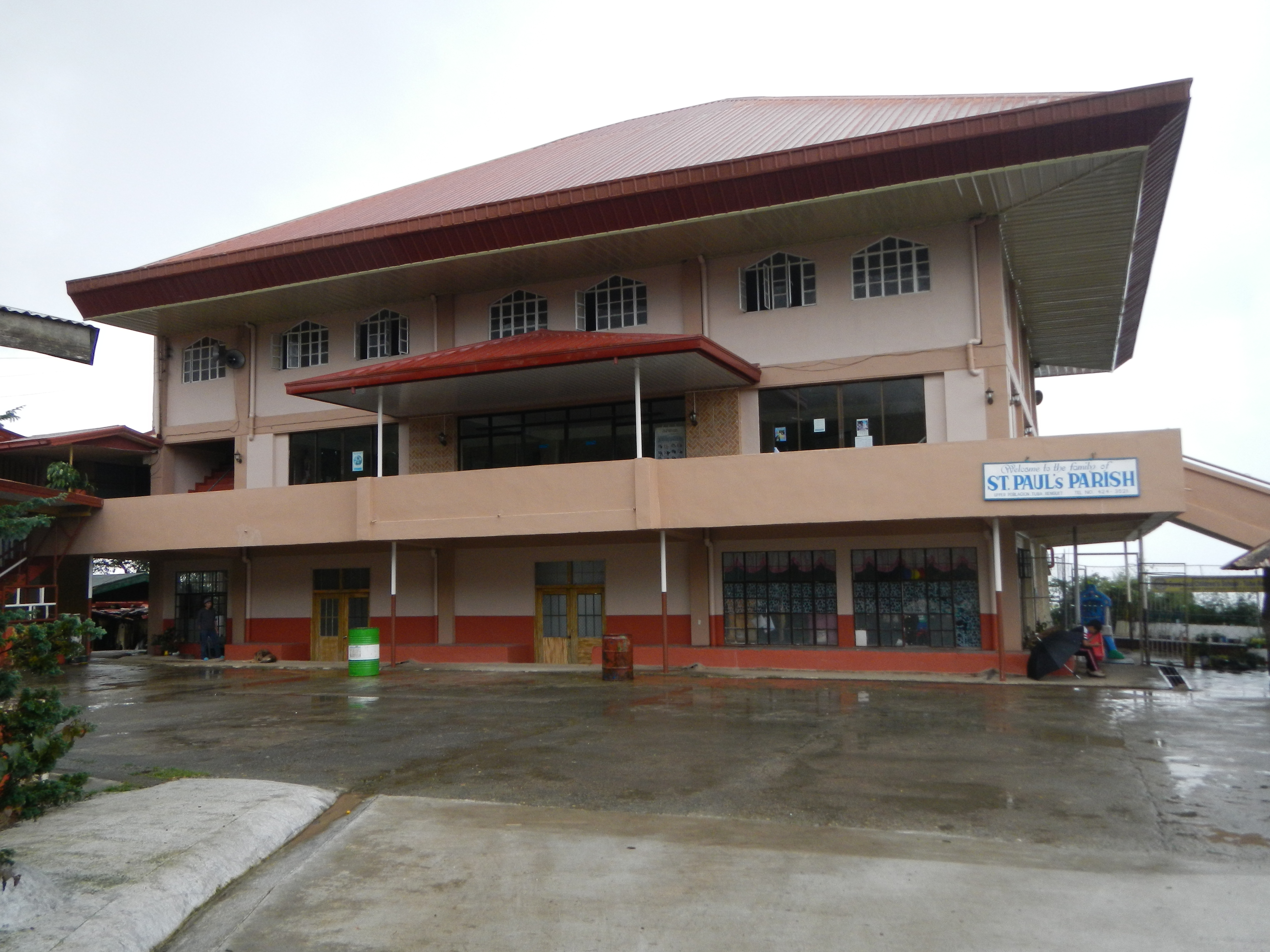
Conversion of Saint Paul Parish Church

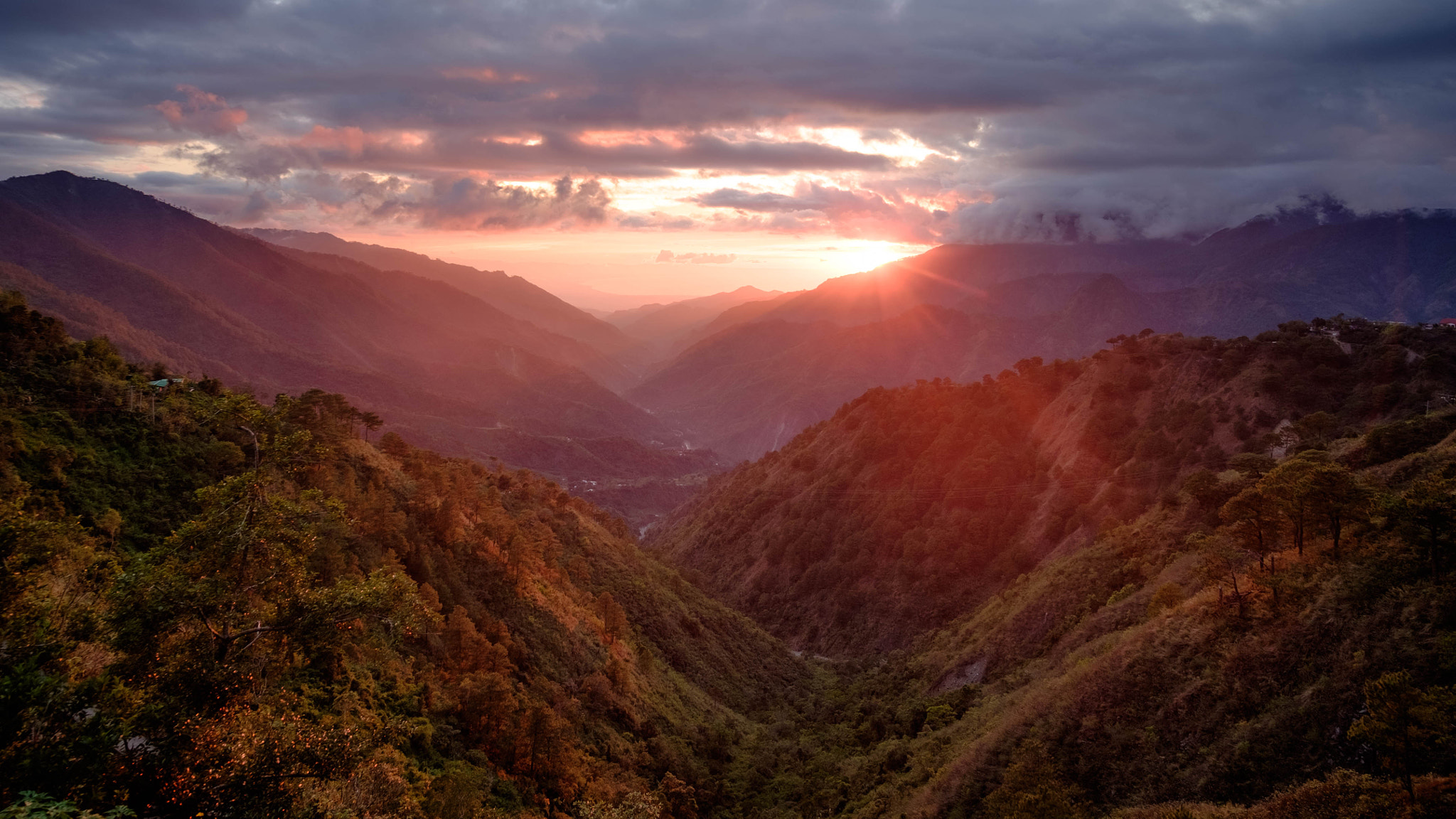
The rugged Bued River valley as viewed from Philex Road

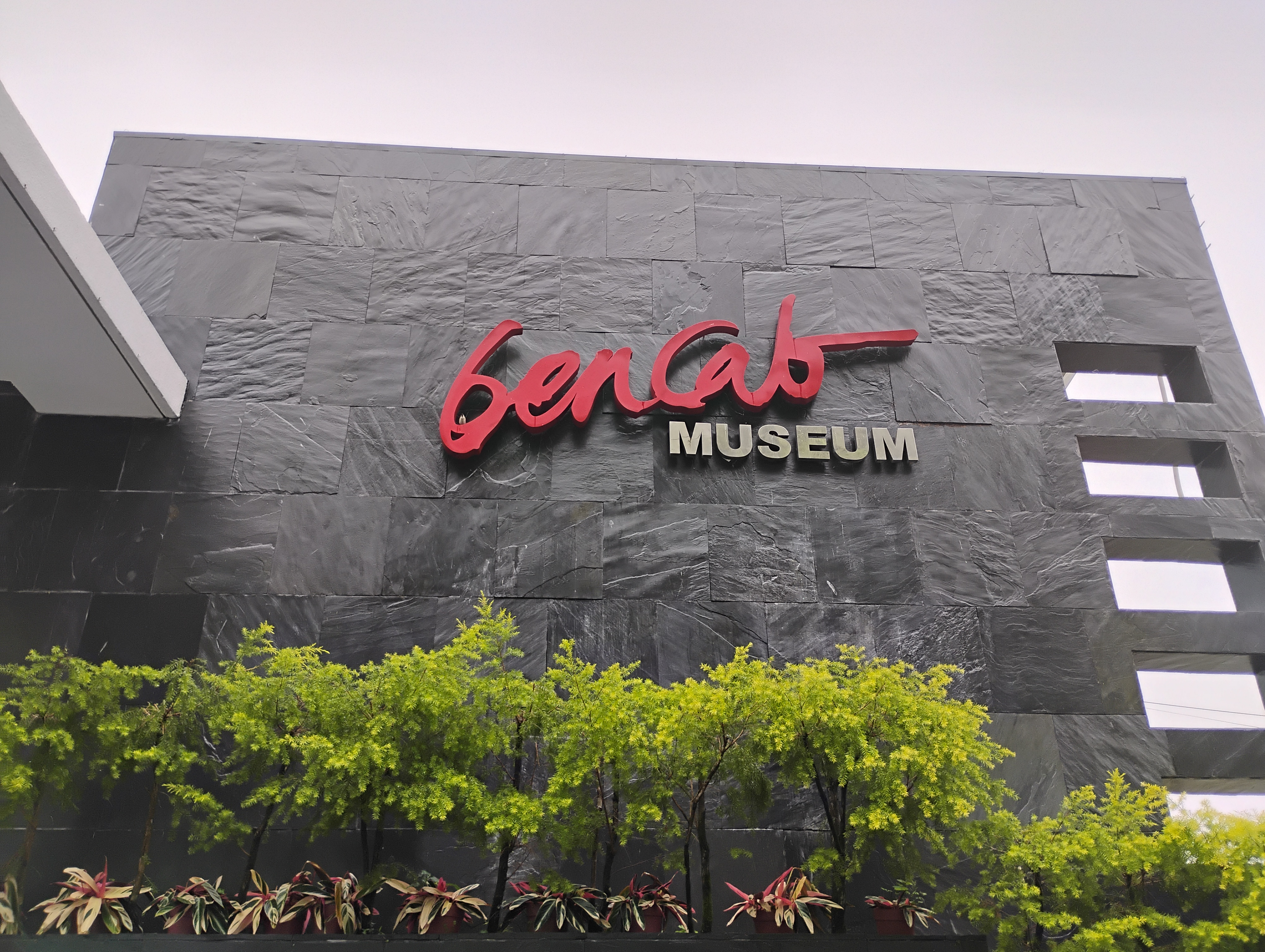
BenCab Museum
