= Mount Santo Tomas =

Stratovolcano in Benguet, Philippines

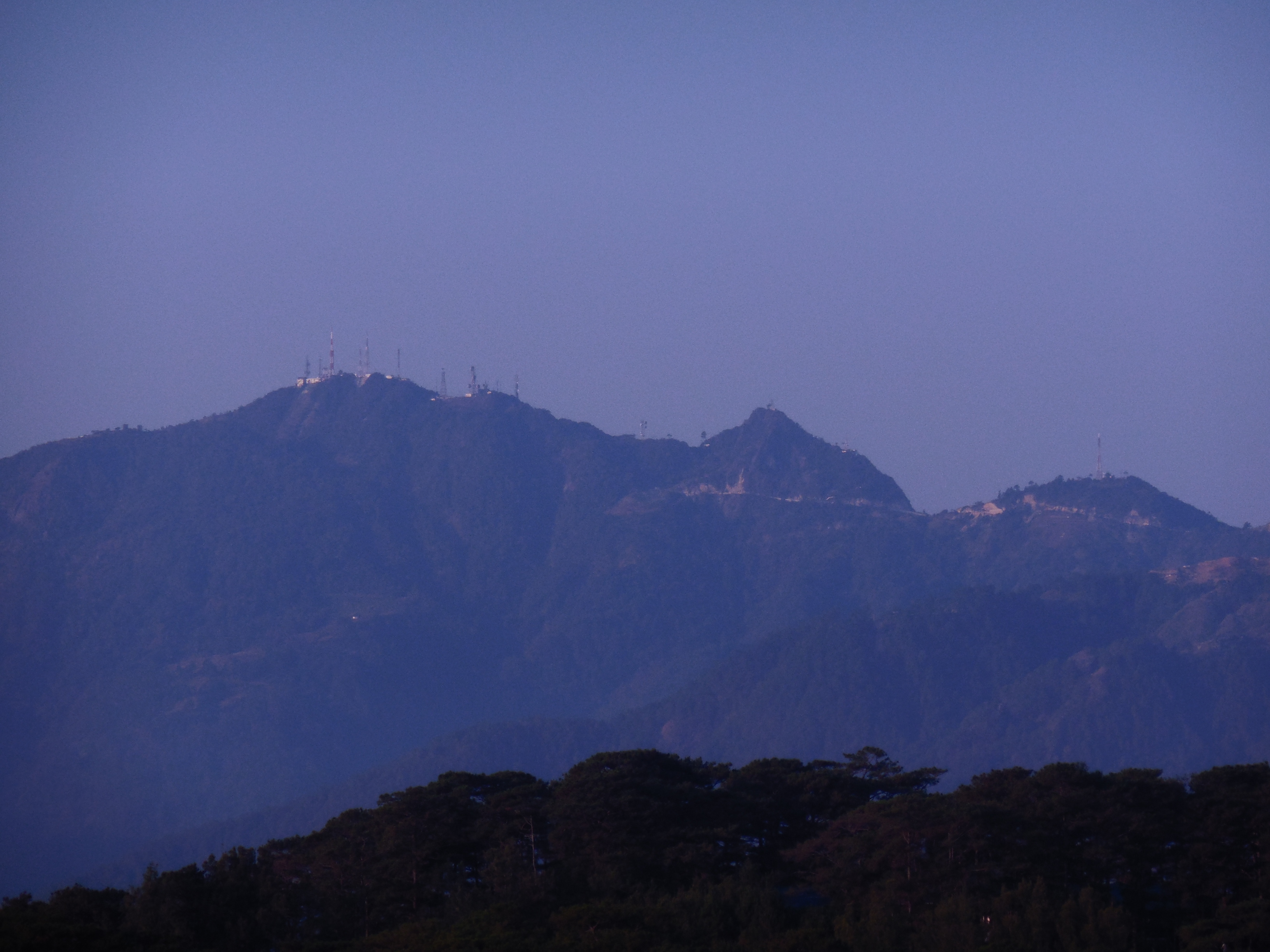
- Mount Santo Tomas with its several TV and cellular transmitter towers

Highest point
- Elevation: 2,260 m (7,410 ft)
- Prominence: 888 m (2,913 ft)
- Listing: potentially active volcanoes
- Coordinates: 16°20′06″N 120°33′40″E

Geography
- Location within Philippines
- Location: Luzon
- Country: Philippines
- Region: Cordillera Administrative Region
- Province: Benguet
- Municipality: Tuba
- Parent range: Cordillera Central

Geology
- Mountain type: Stratovolcano
- Volcanic arc: Luzon Volcanic Arc

Mount Santo Tomas (Ilocano: Bantay Santo Tomas, Tagalog: Bundok Santo Tomas) is a potentially active stratovolcano in the Philippines located in the municipality of Tuba in the province of Benguet. The mountain is part of the protected Santo Tomas Forest Reserve declared through Proclamation No. 581 signed by President Manuel L. Quezon on July 9, 1940.

On May 5, 2015, a Permanent Environmental Protection Order was issued by the Court of Appeals with the Writ of Kalikasan and Writ of Continuing Mandamus.

Due to its high elevation, several communications and broadcasting companies constructed relay stations at the summit.

== Physical features ==
Mount Santo Tomas is a stratovolcano with numerous volcanic vents and fissures.

== Listings ==
Philippine Institute of Volcanology and Seismology (PHIVOLCS) lists Mount Santo Tomas as potentially active volcano.

The Global Volcanism Program is uncertain about the last activity of Mount Santo Tomas.

== Eruptions ==
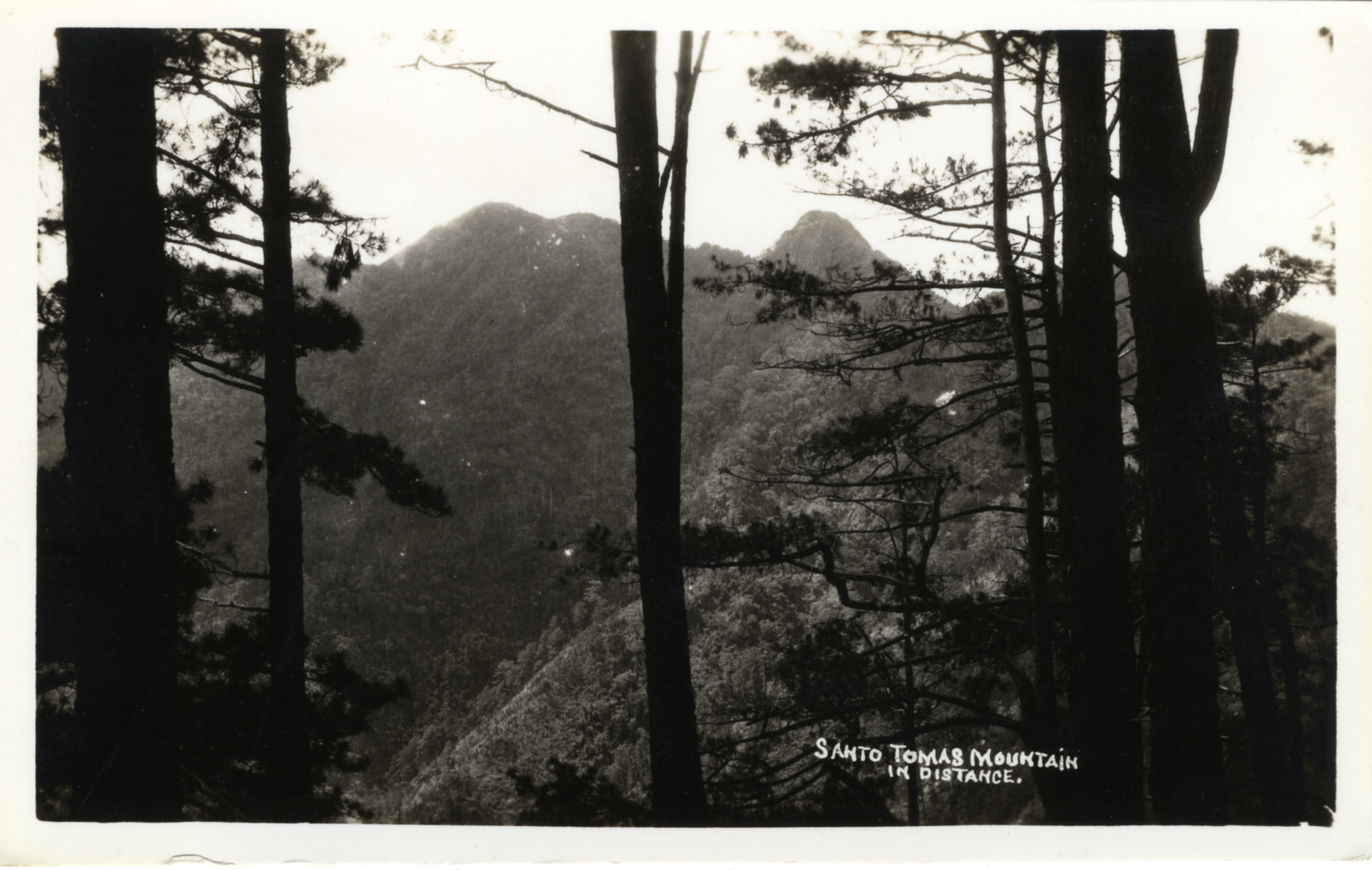
Mount Santo Tomas, circa pre-1930

The last eruption was recorded on January 4, 1641, together with Mount Melibengoy—then known as Parker Volcano—of Southern Mindanao.

== Geology ==
Rock type is not reported.

Mount Santo Tomas is close to the auriferous volcanic placements near Baguio, and beside the fault line which occasioned the July 16, 1990, earthquake devastating much of Luzon, and especially Baguio.

== See also ==
- List of active volcanoes in the Philippines
- List of potentially active volcanoes in the Philippines
- List of inactive volcanoes in the Philippines
- Philippine Institute of Volcanology and Seismology
